= List of cities in Ukraine =

Map of Ukraine showing its largest cities

There are 463 populated places in Ukraine that have been officially granted city status (Ukrainian: місто, romanized: misto) by the Verkhovna Rada, the country's parliament, as of 23 April 2025. Settlements with more than 10,000 people are eligible for city status although the status is typically also granted to settlements of historical or regional importance.

Smaller settlements are rural settlements (Ukrainian: селище, romanized: selyshche) and villages (Ukrainian: село, romanized: selo).

Historically, there were systems of city rights, granted by the territorial lords, which defined the status of a place as a misto or selo. In the past, cities were self-governing and had several privileges.

The list of cities is roughly ordered by population and the 2022 estimates are compared to the 2001 Ukrainian census, except for Chernobyl for which the population is an unofficial estimate. The cities with special status are shown in italics. The average population size is 62,000.

== List of cities ==
Jump to table of cities

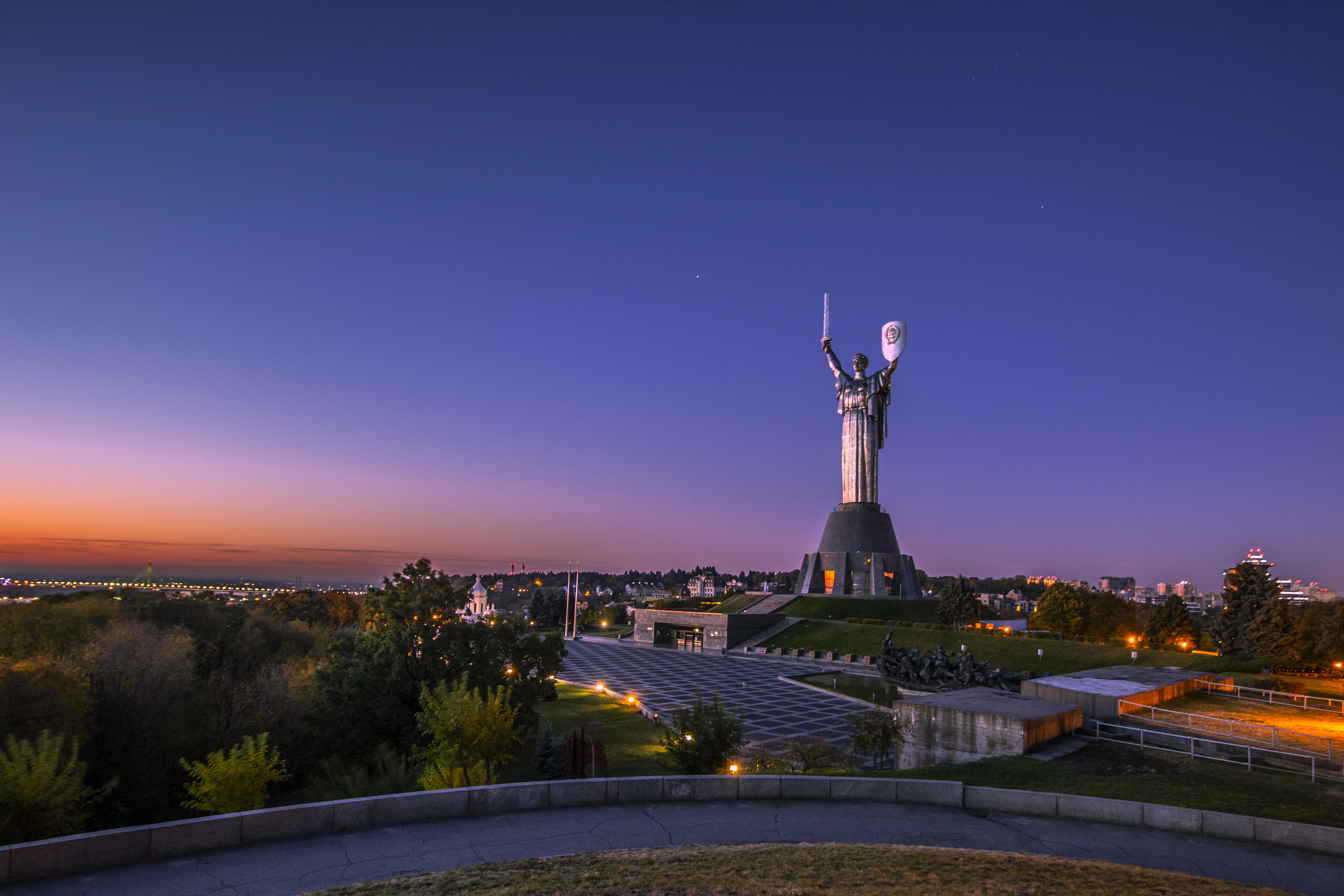
Kyiv

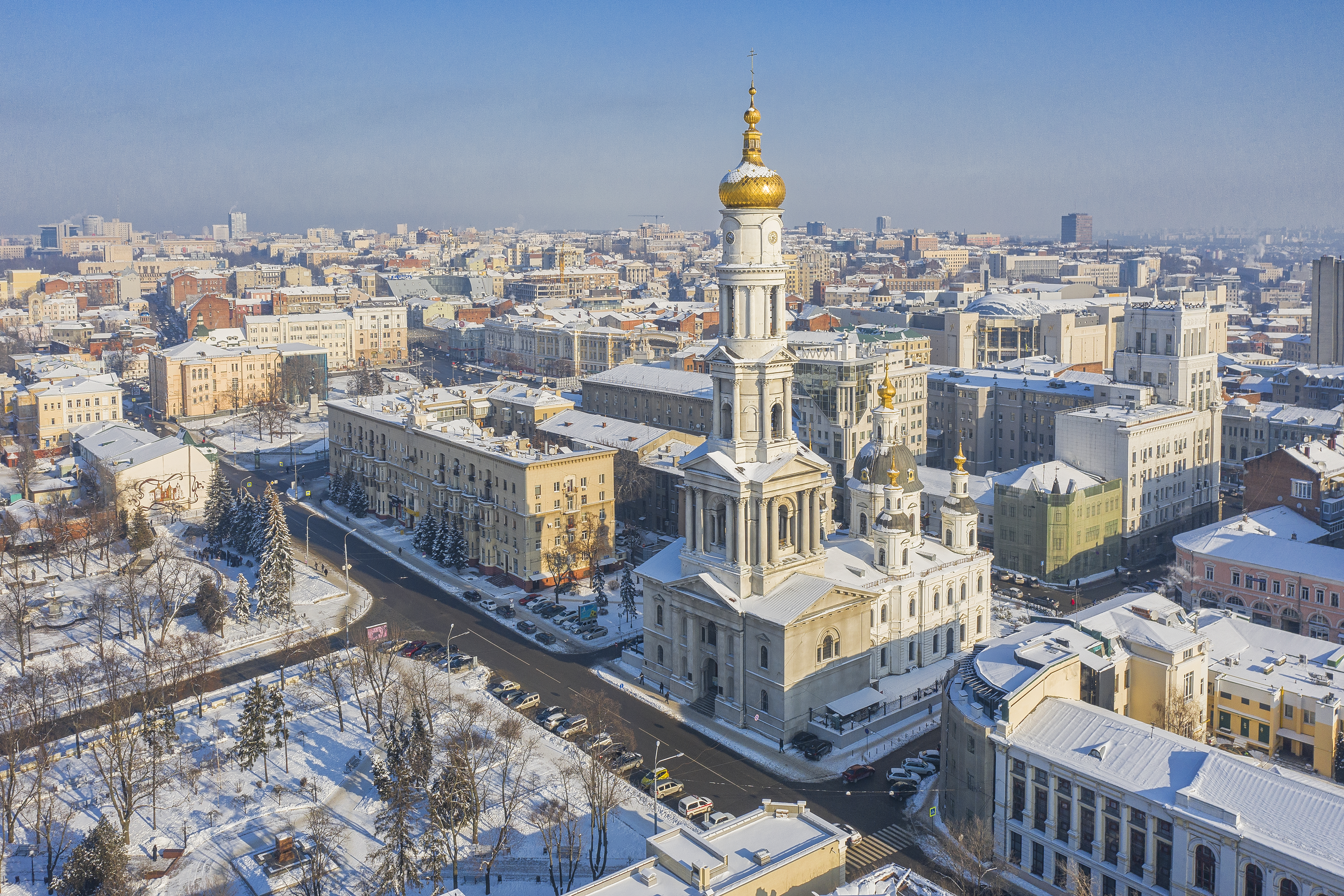
Kharkiv

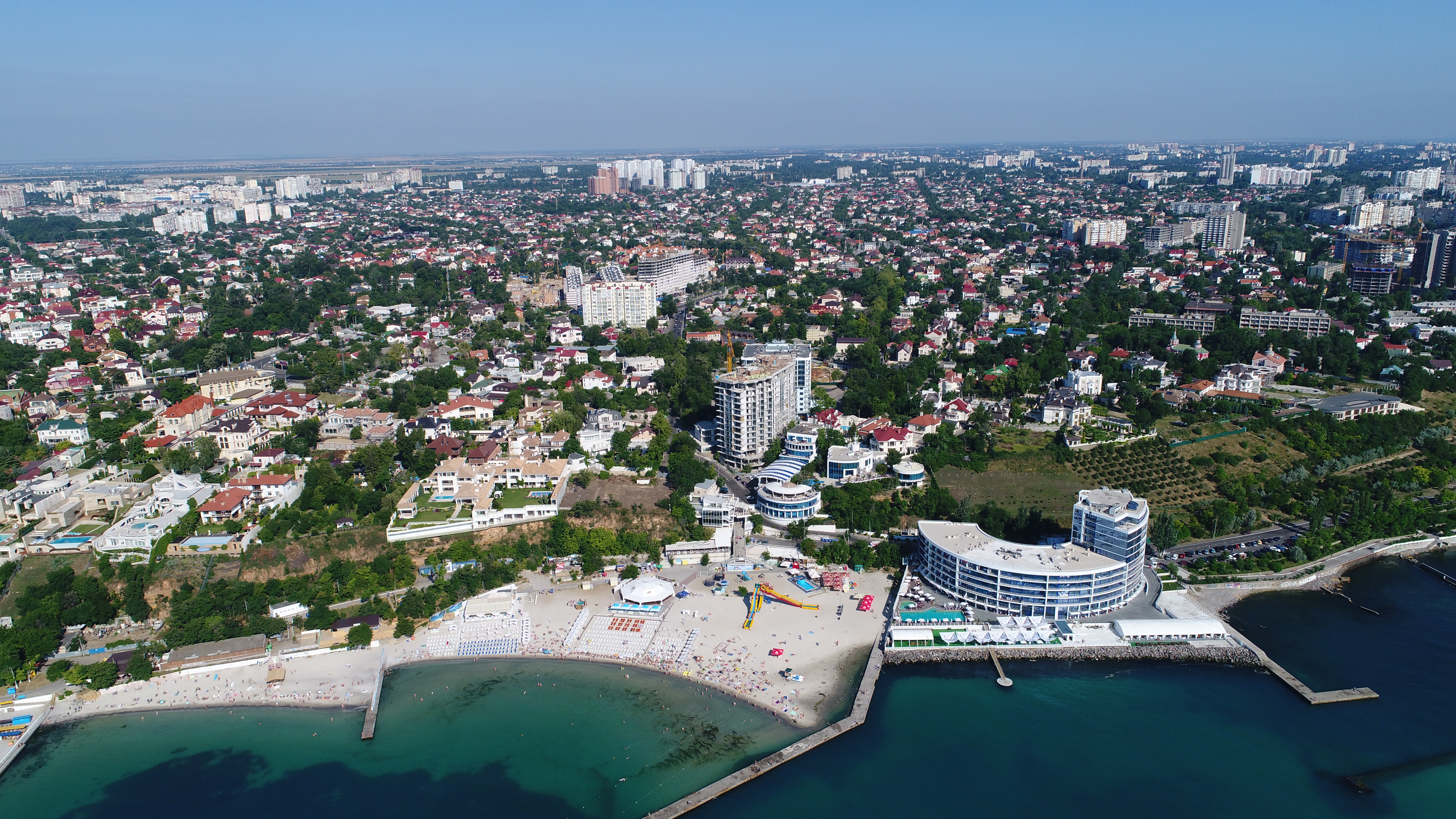
Odesa

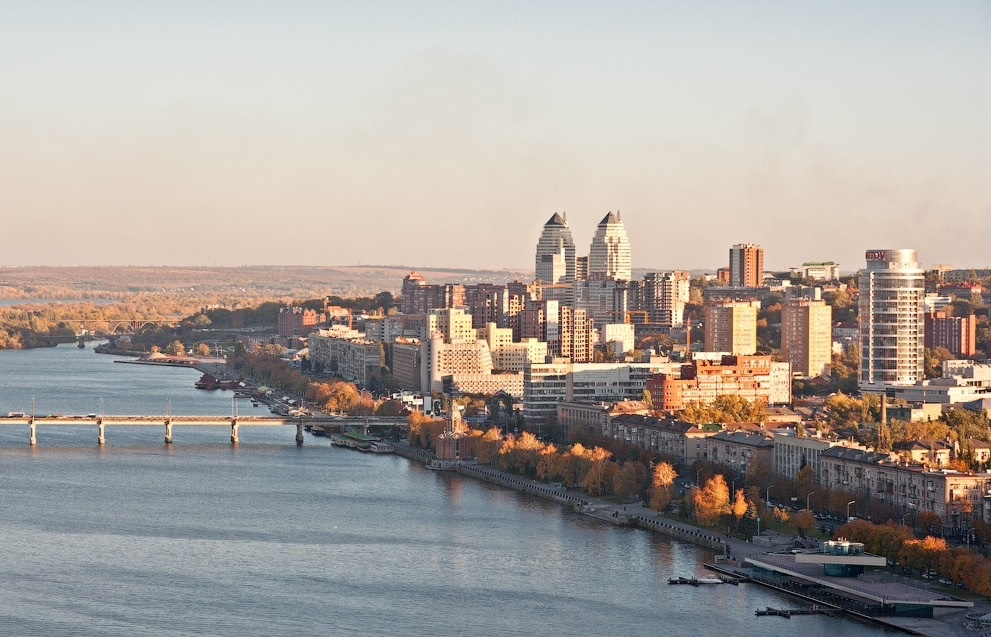
Dnipro

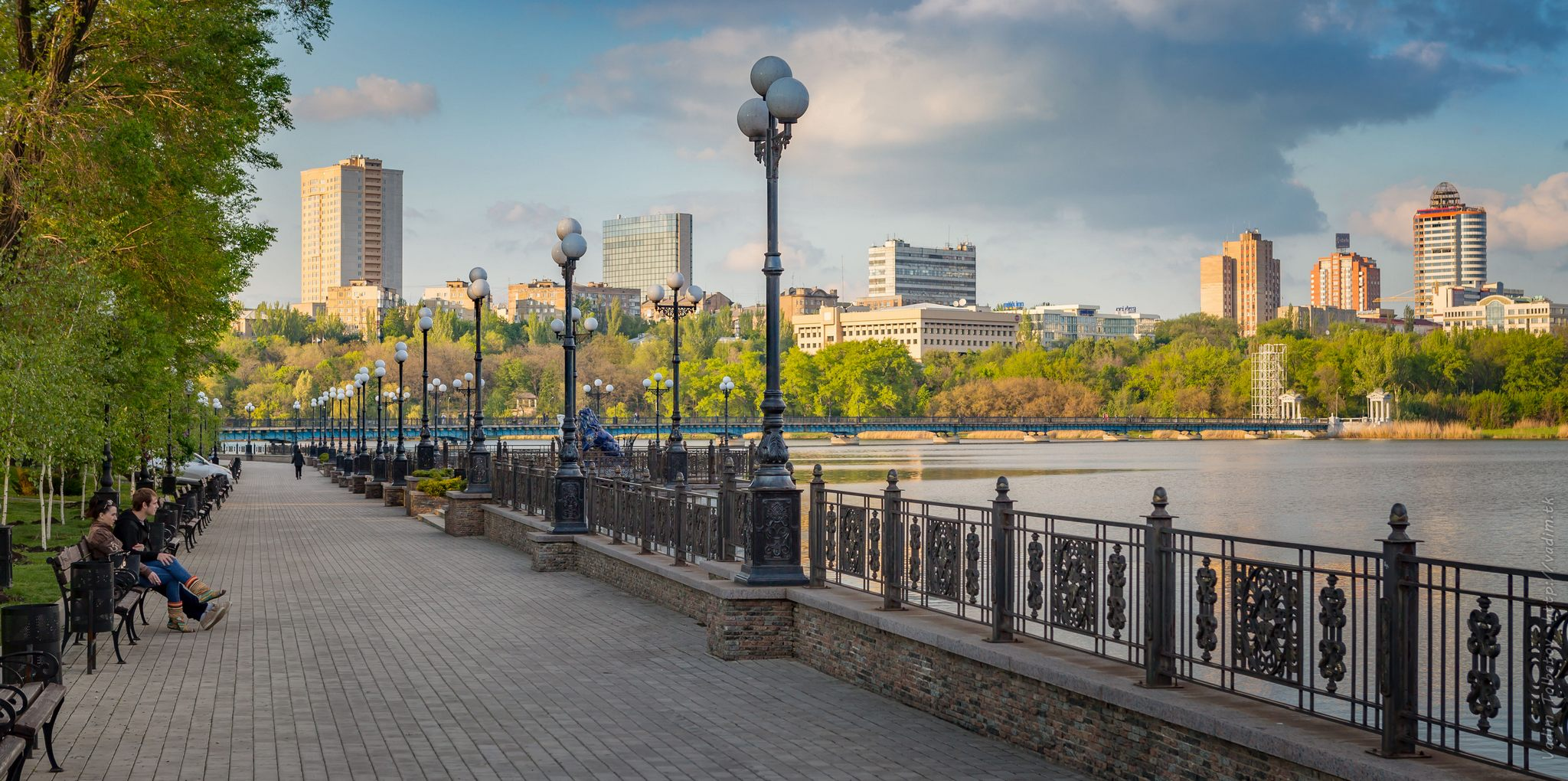
Donetsk

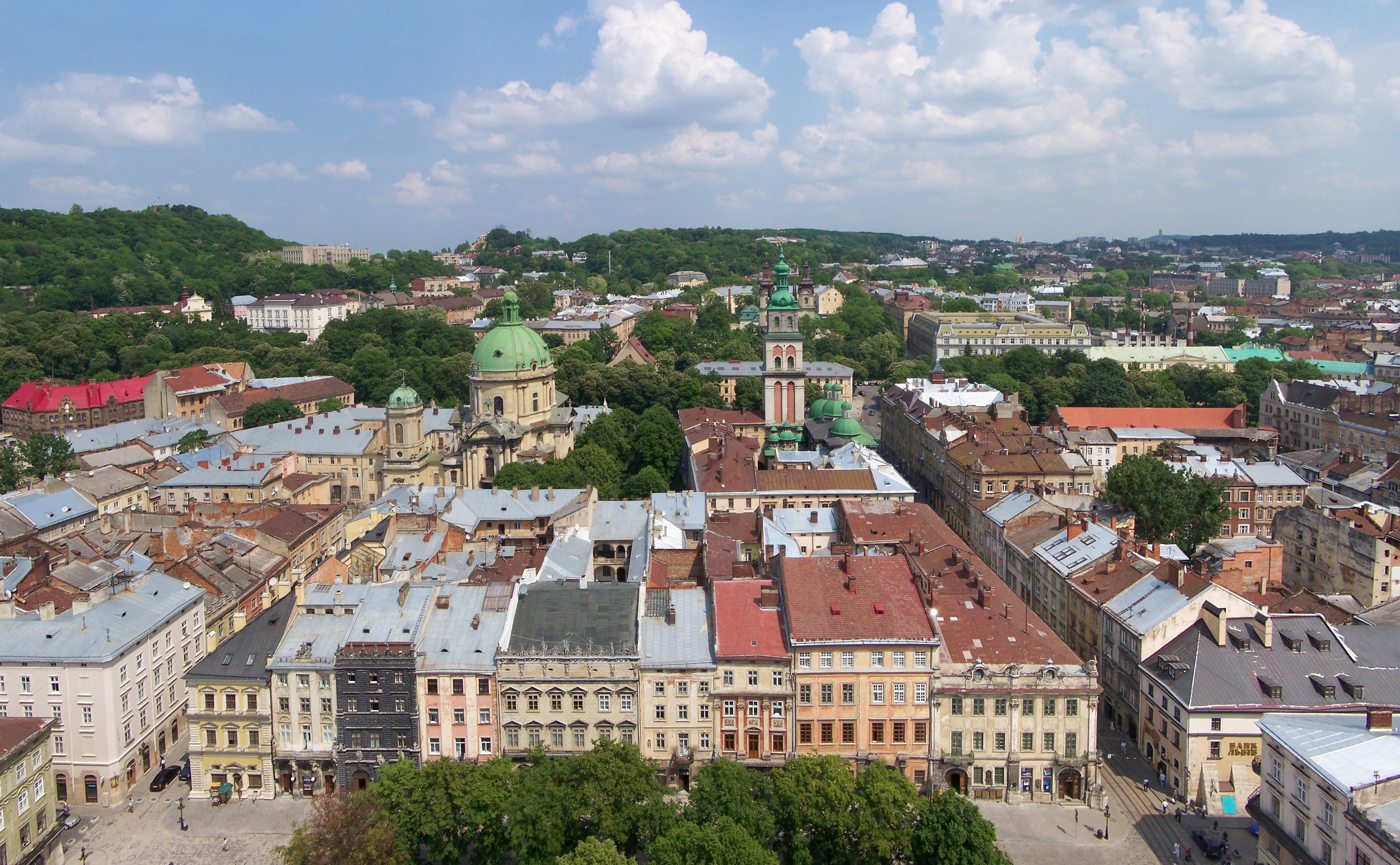
Lviv

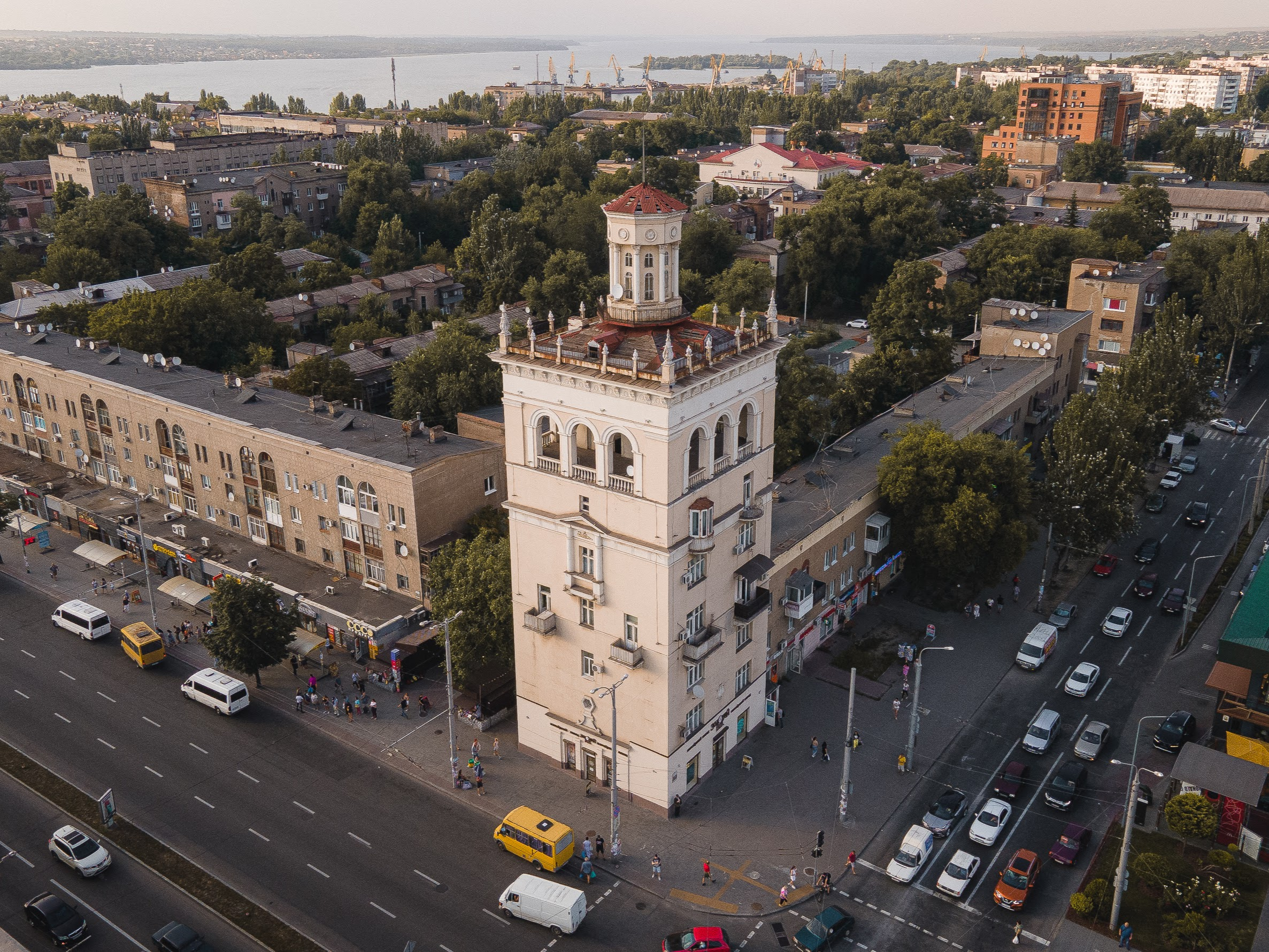
Zaporizhzhia

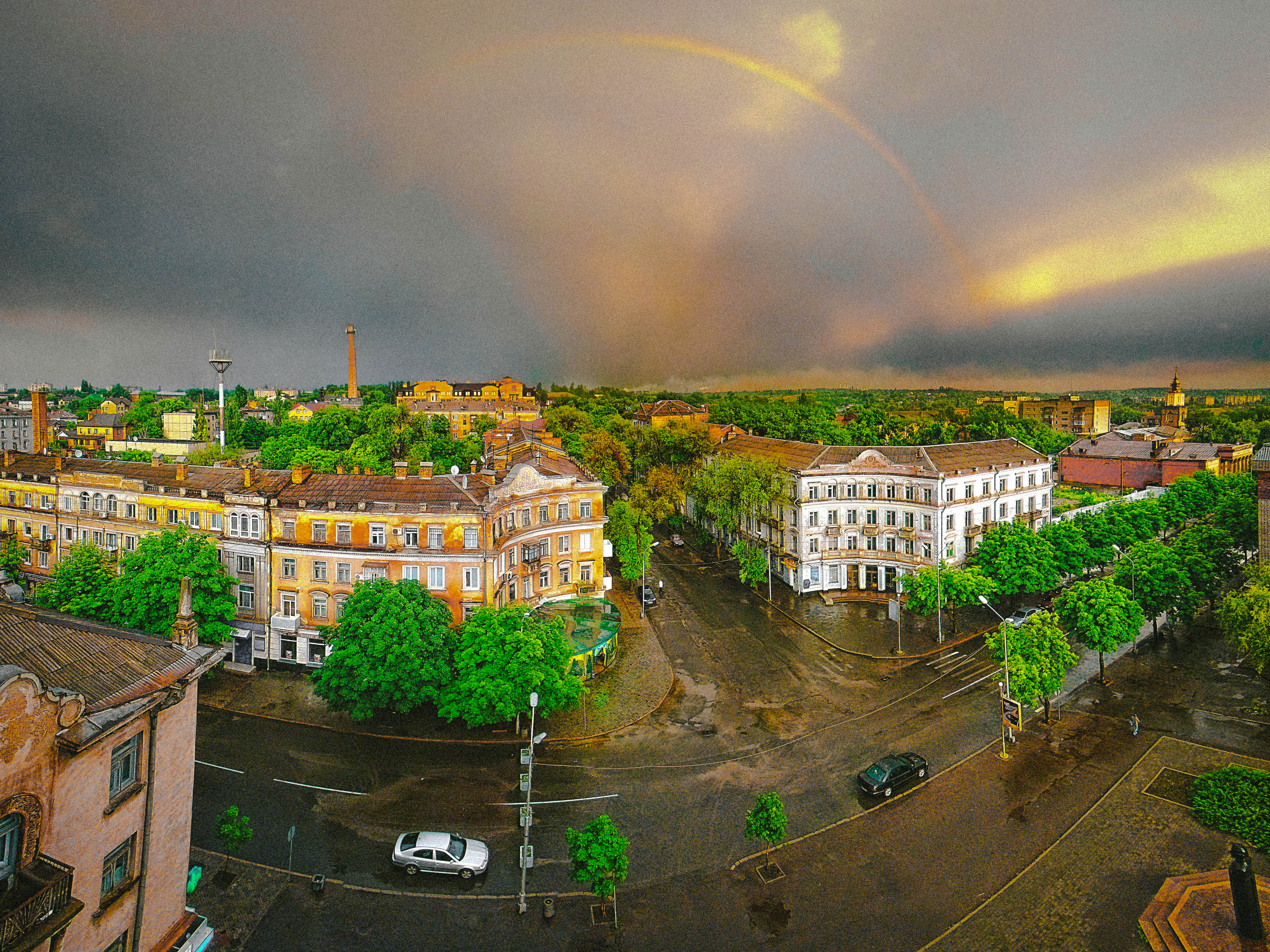
Kryvyi Rih

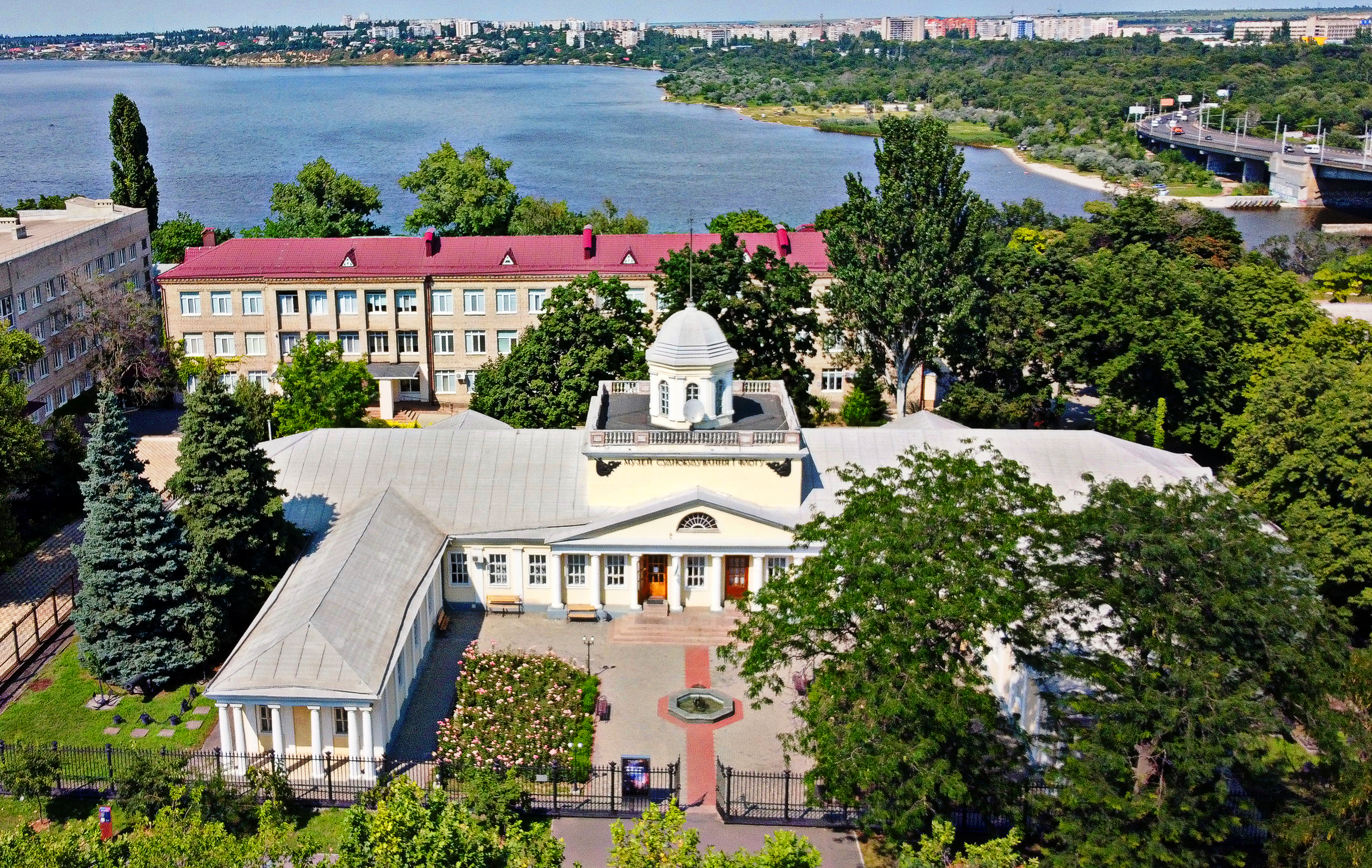
Mykolaiv

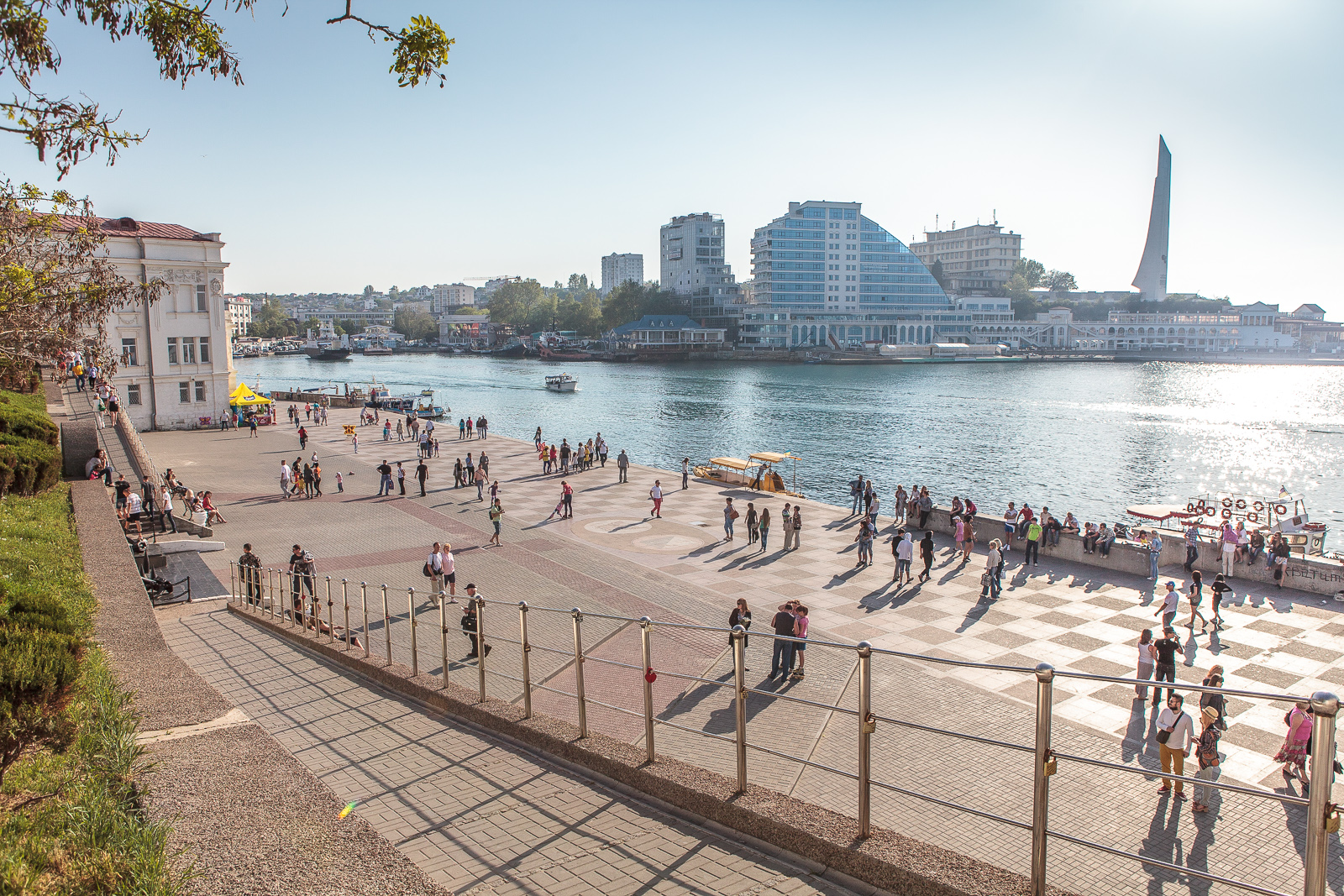
Sevastopol

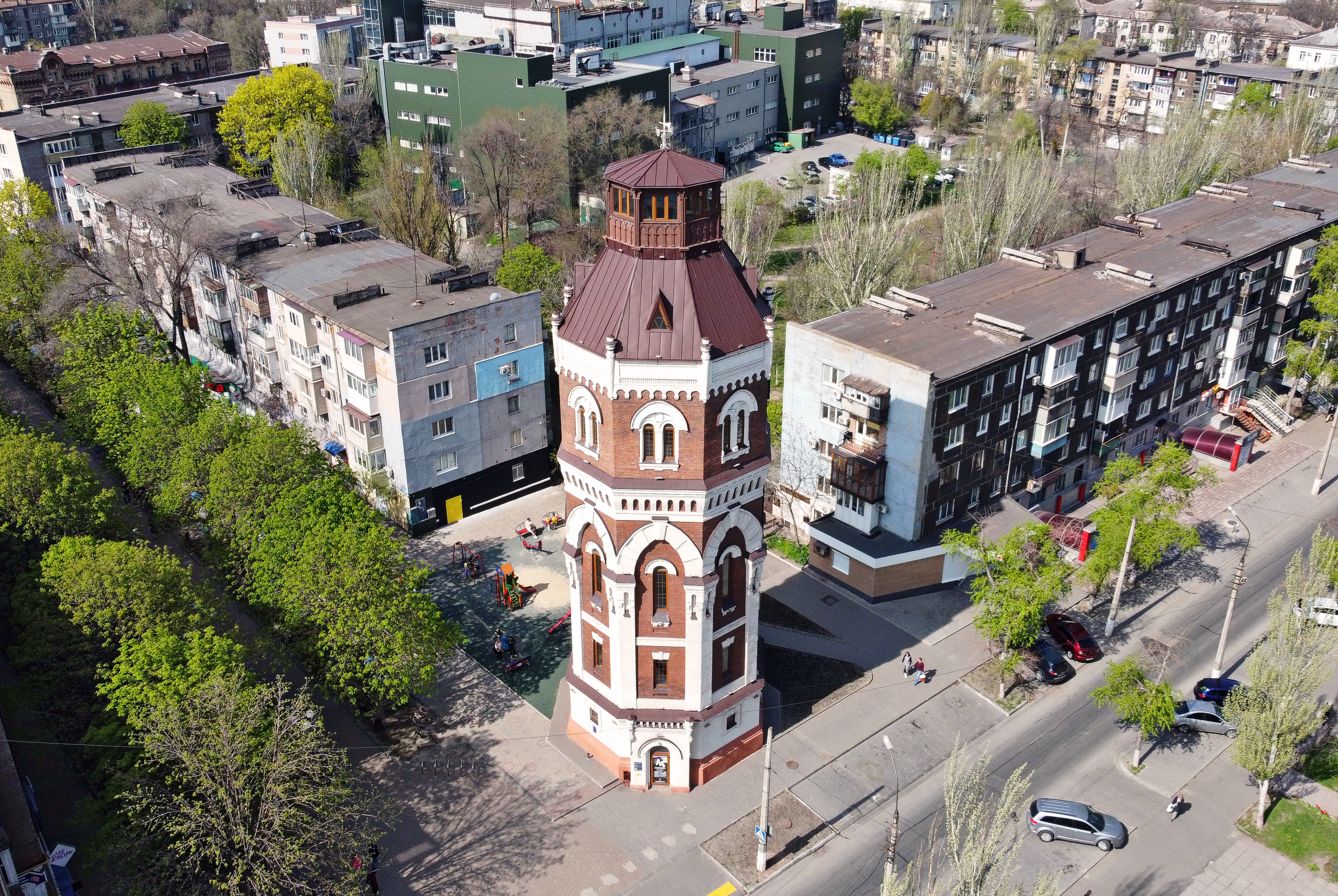
Mariupol

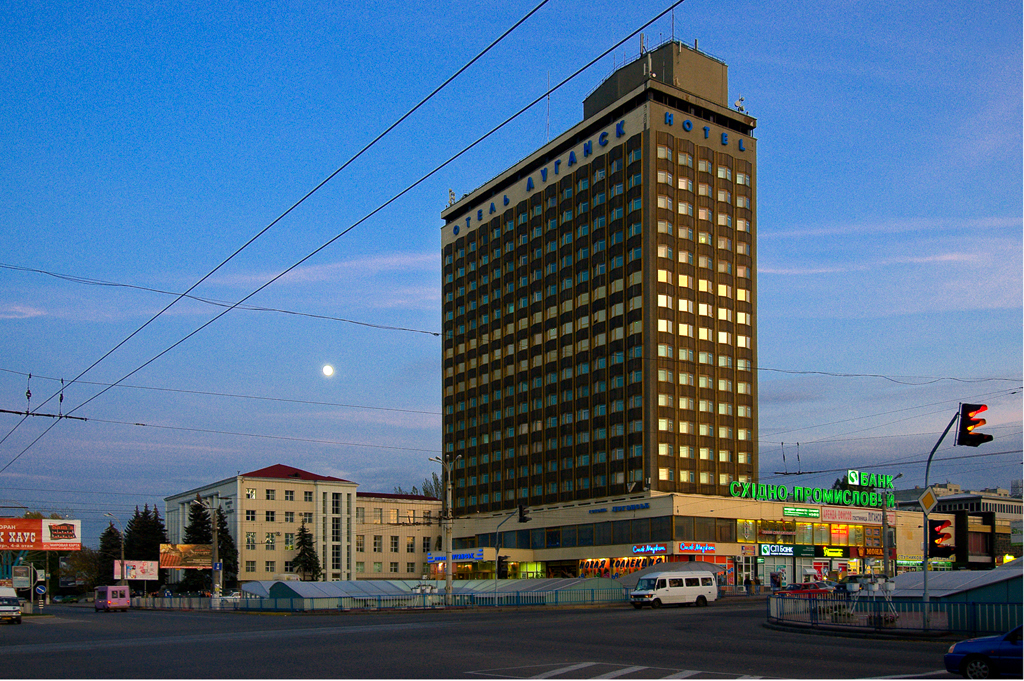
Luhansk

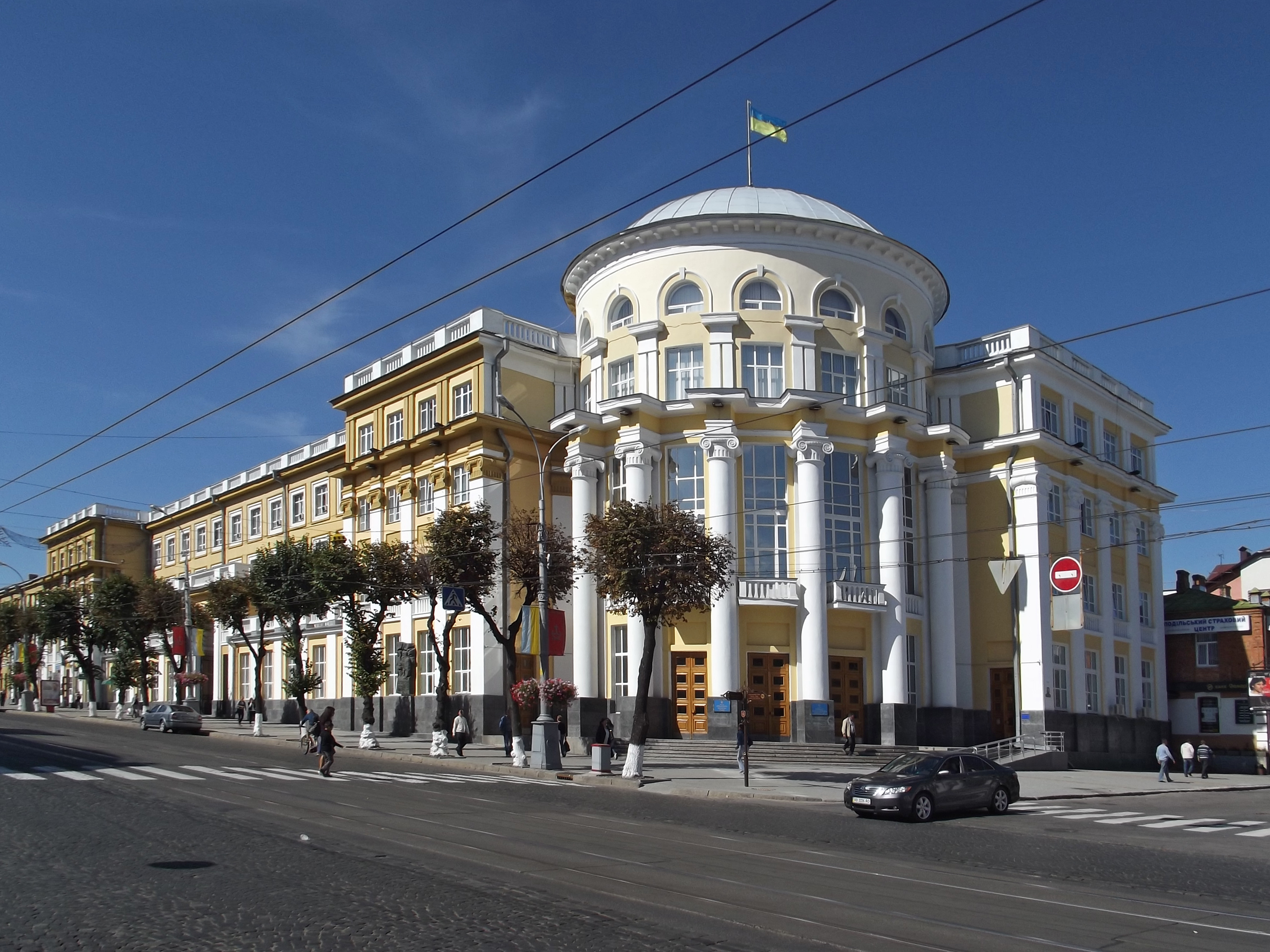
Vinnytsia

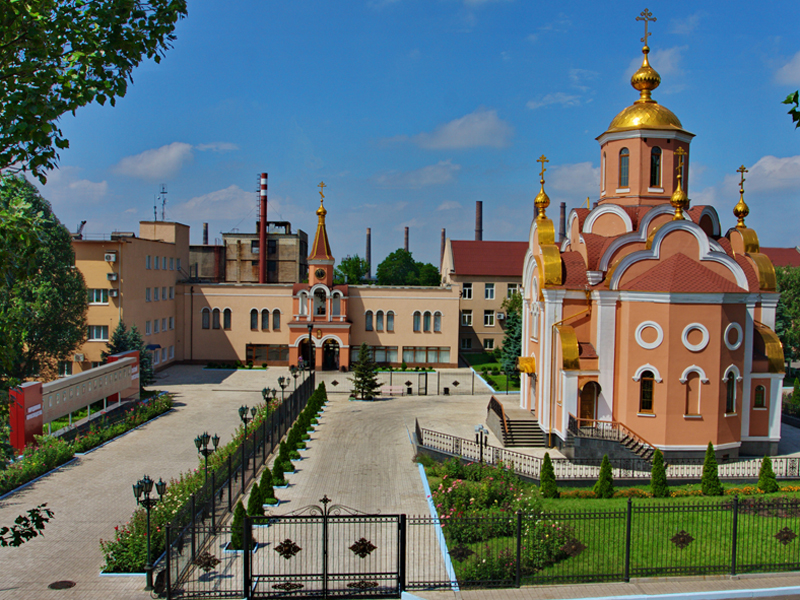
Makiivka

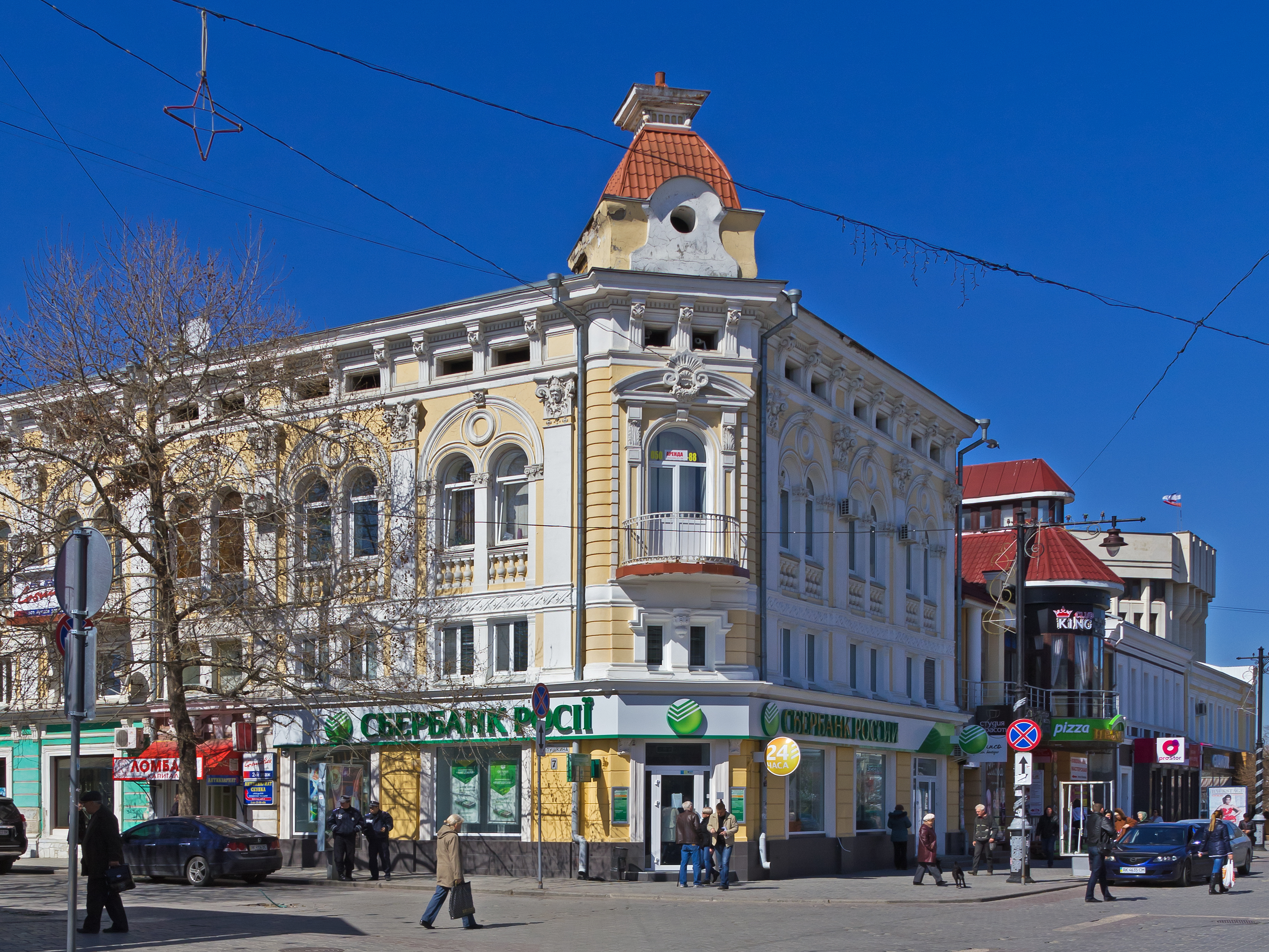
Simferopol

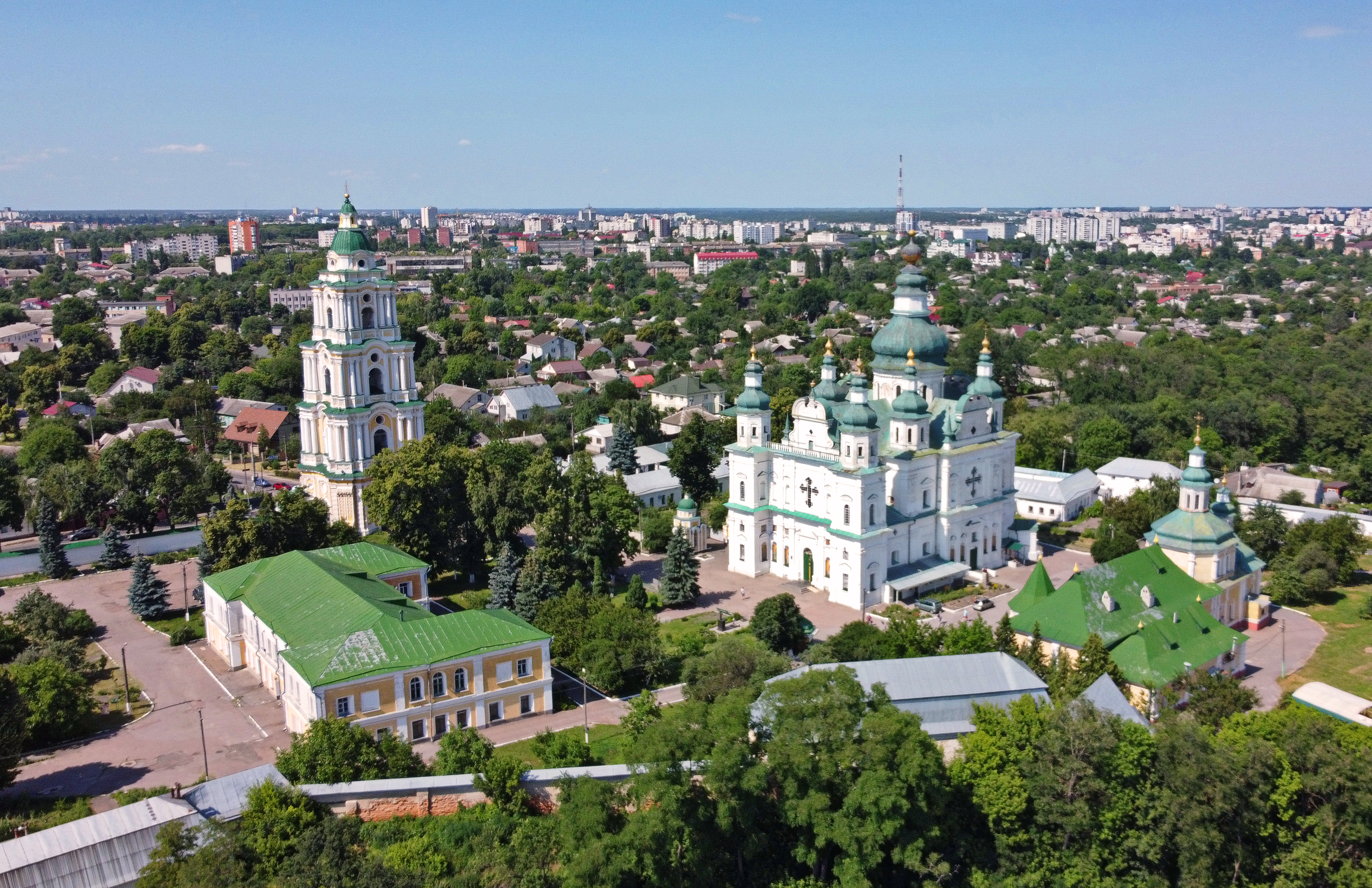
Chernihiv

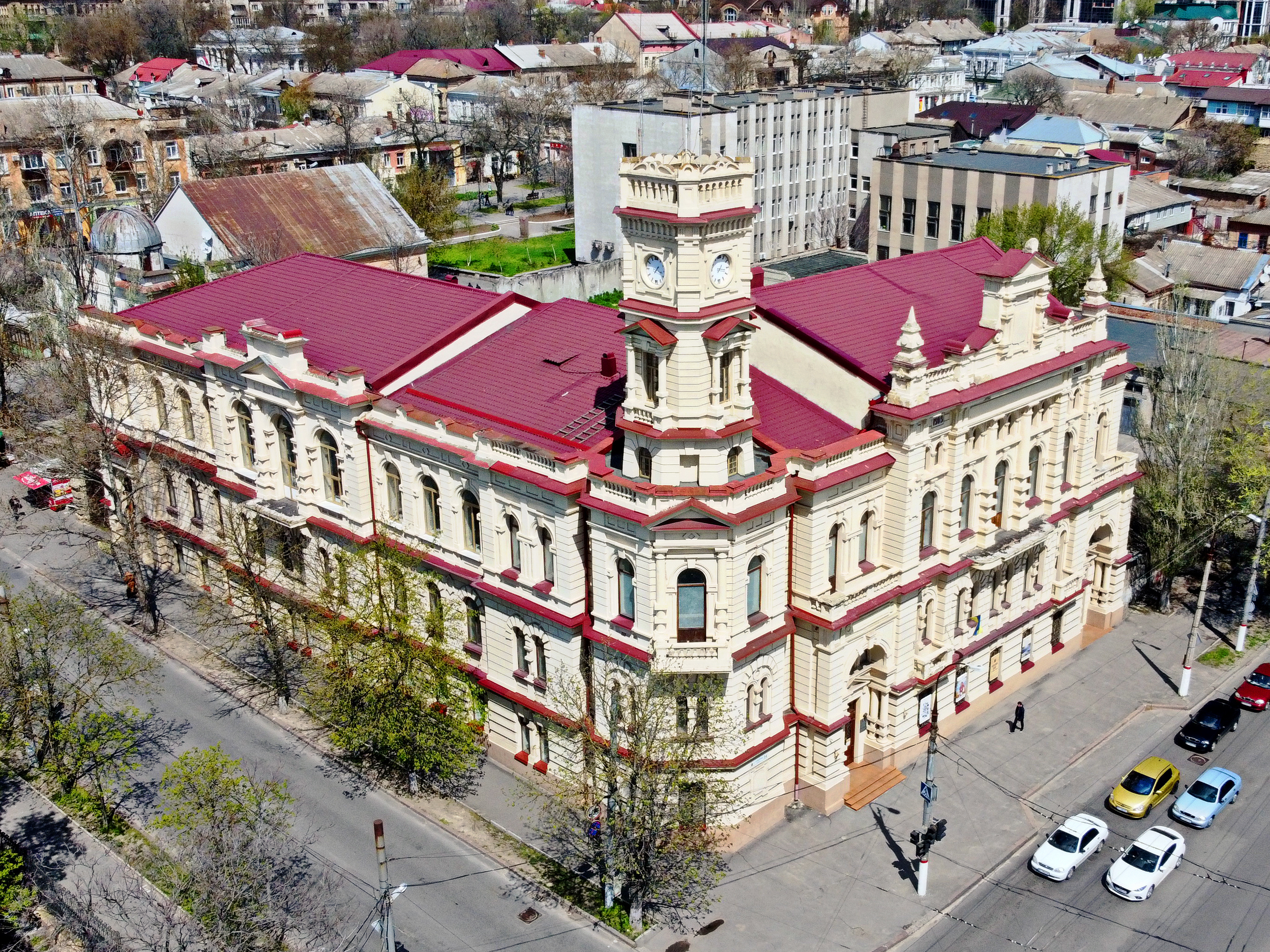
Kherson

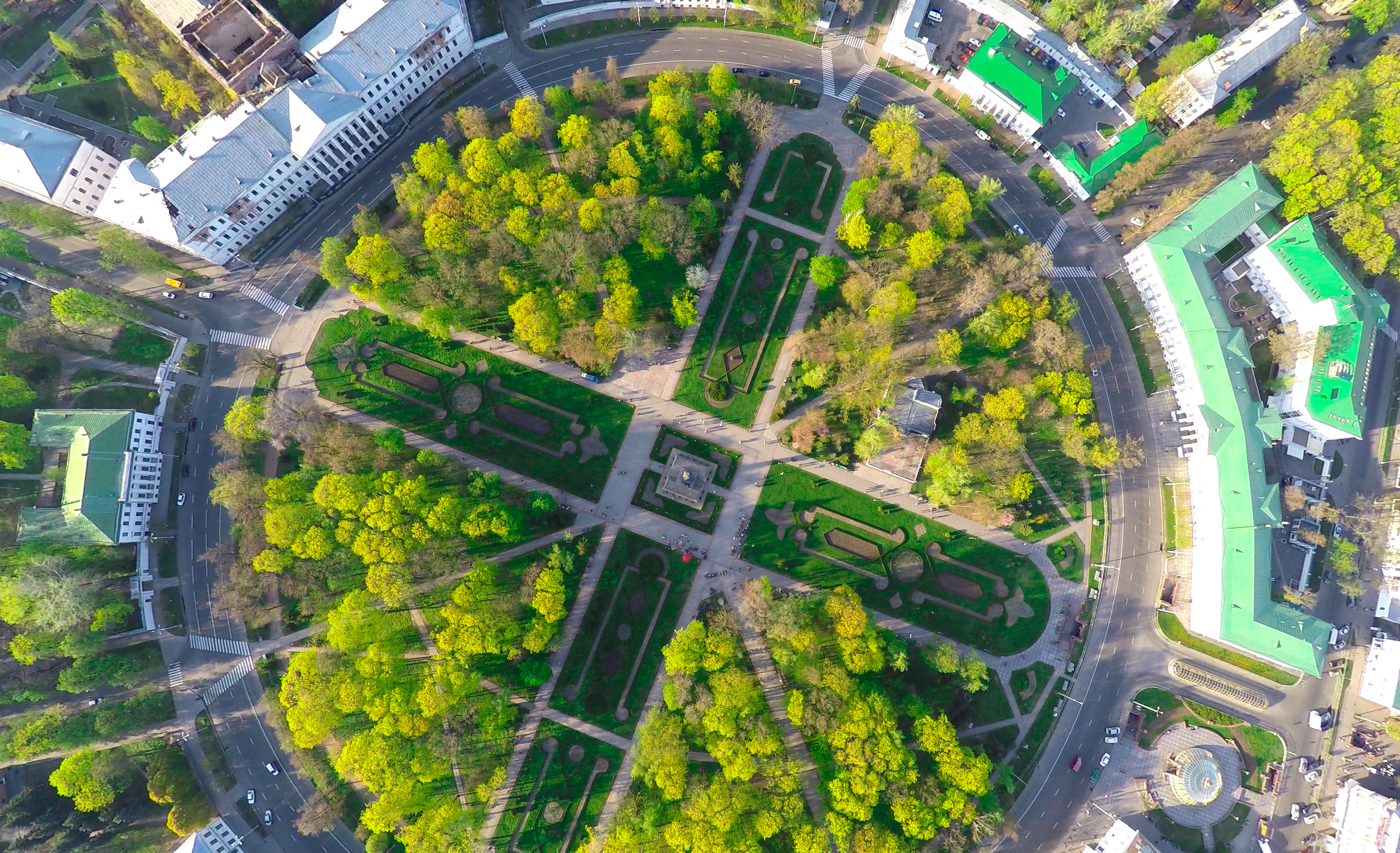
Poltava

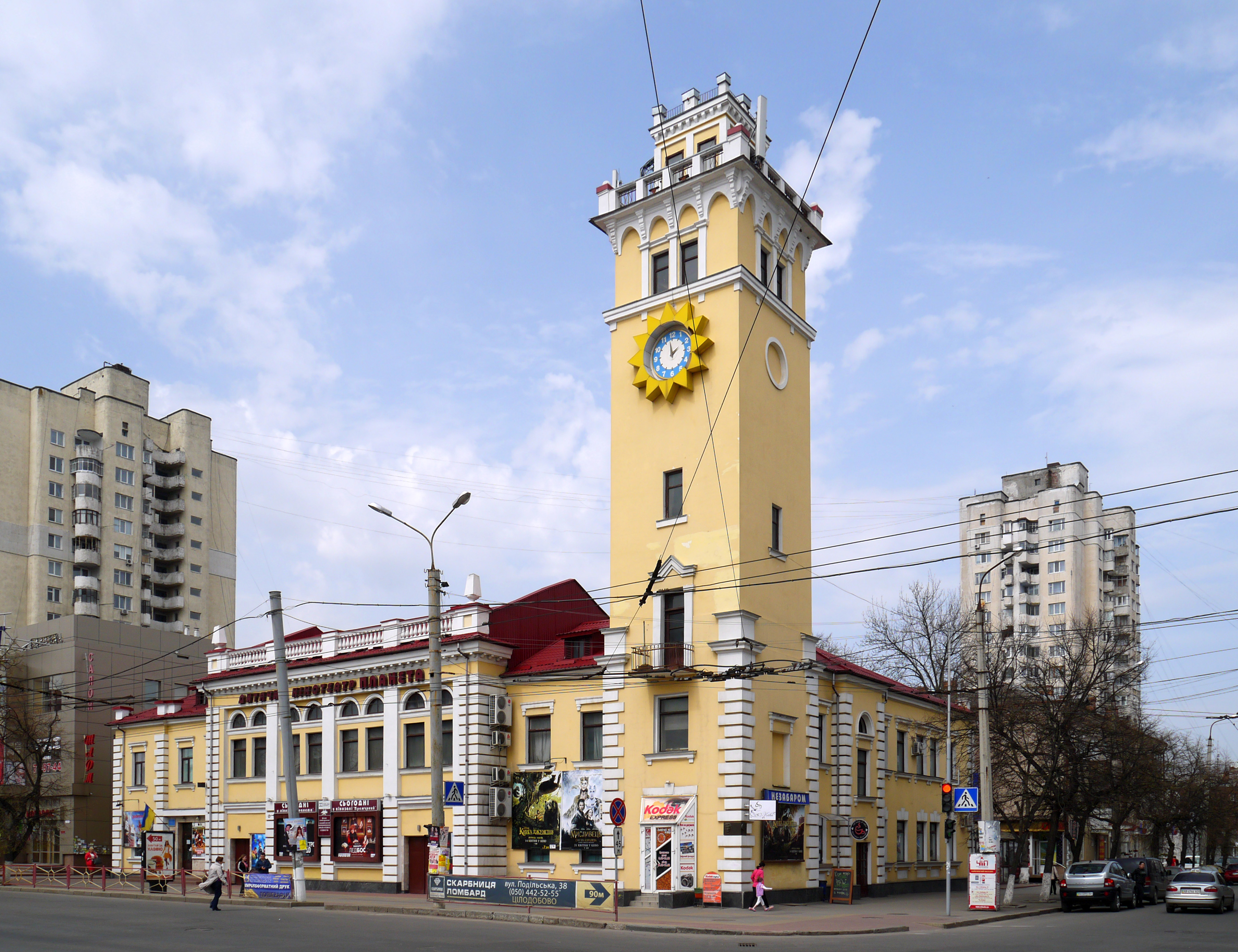
Khmelnytskyi

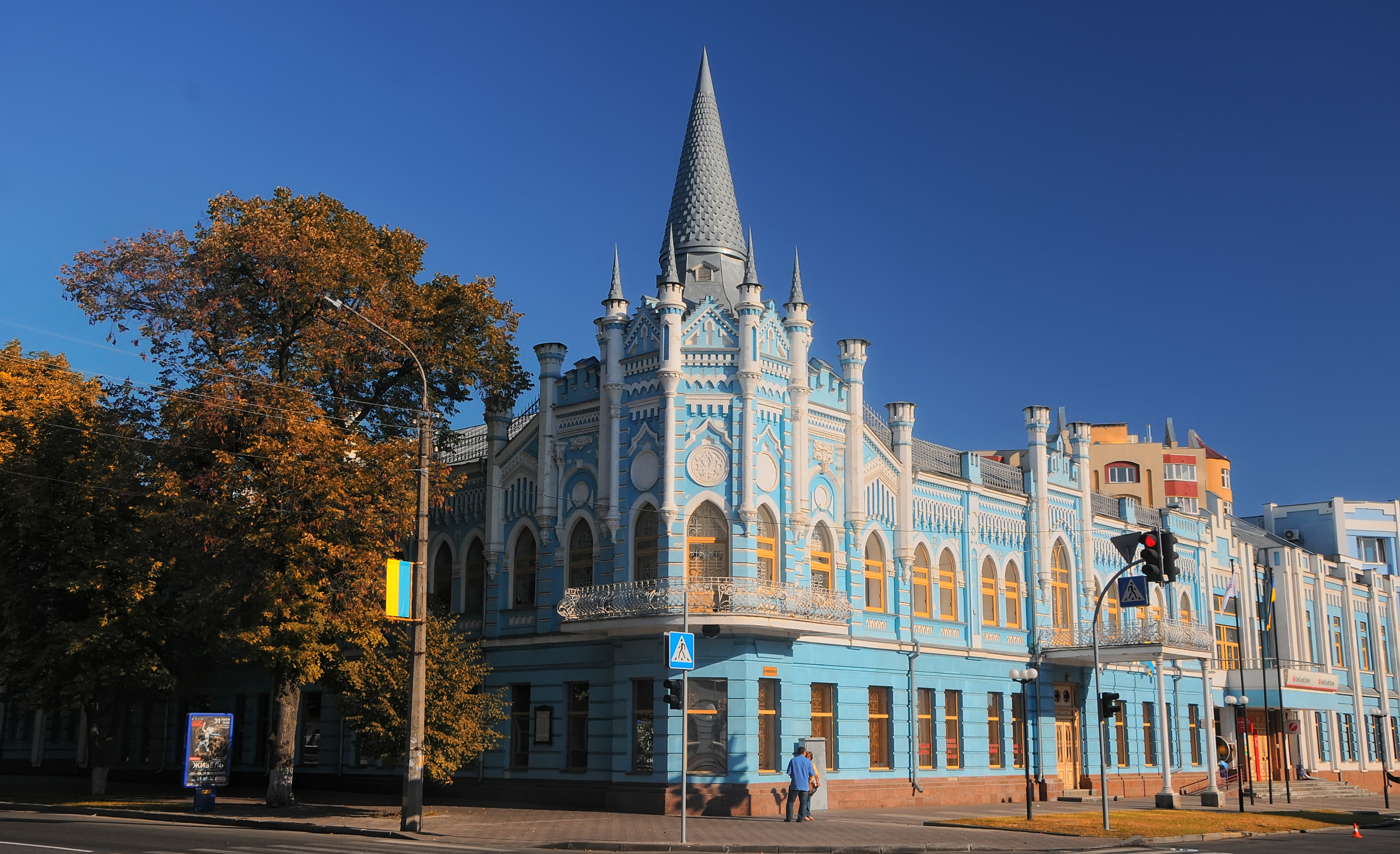
Cherkasy

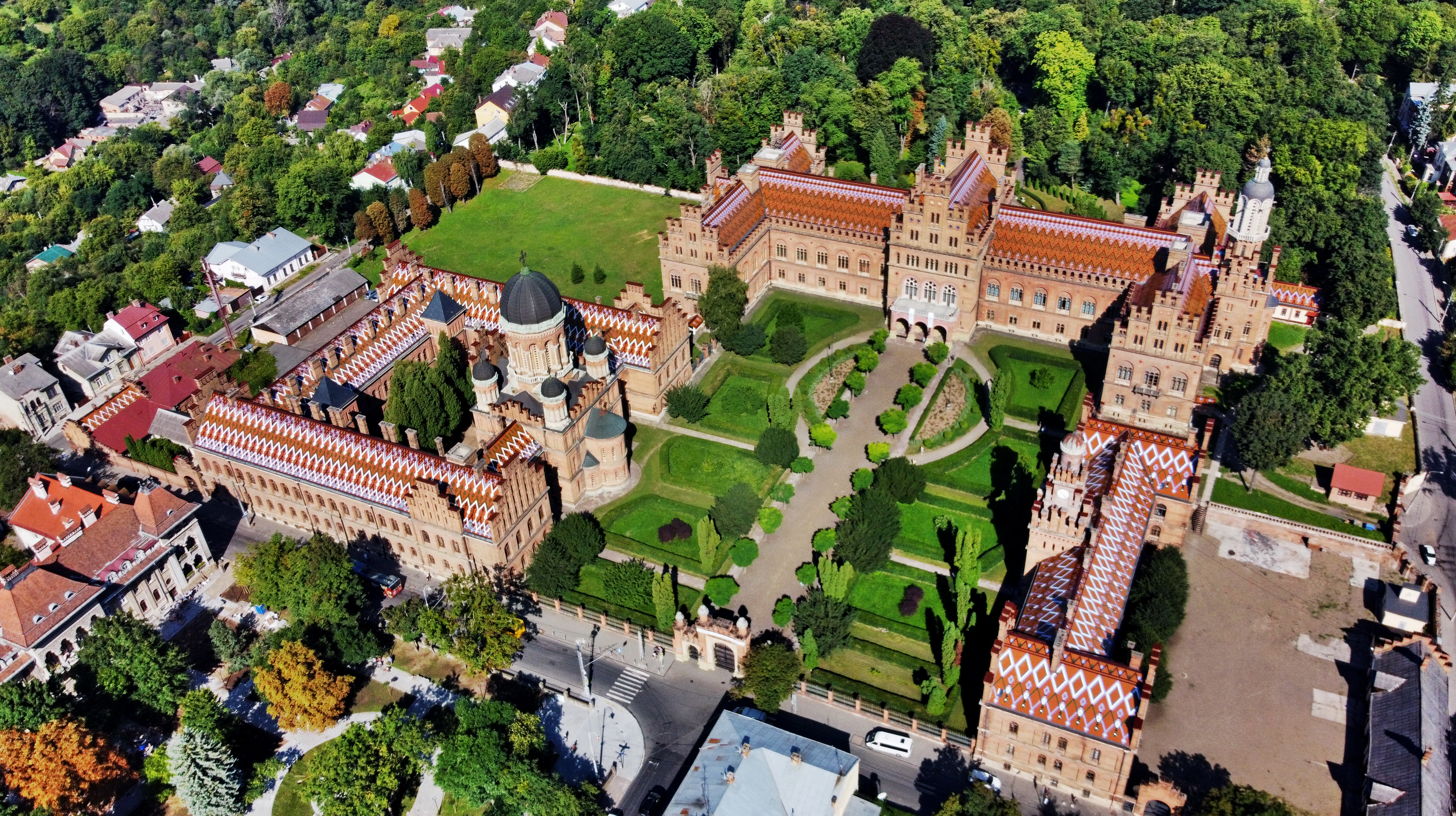
Chernivtsi

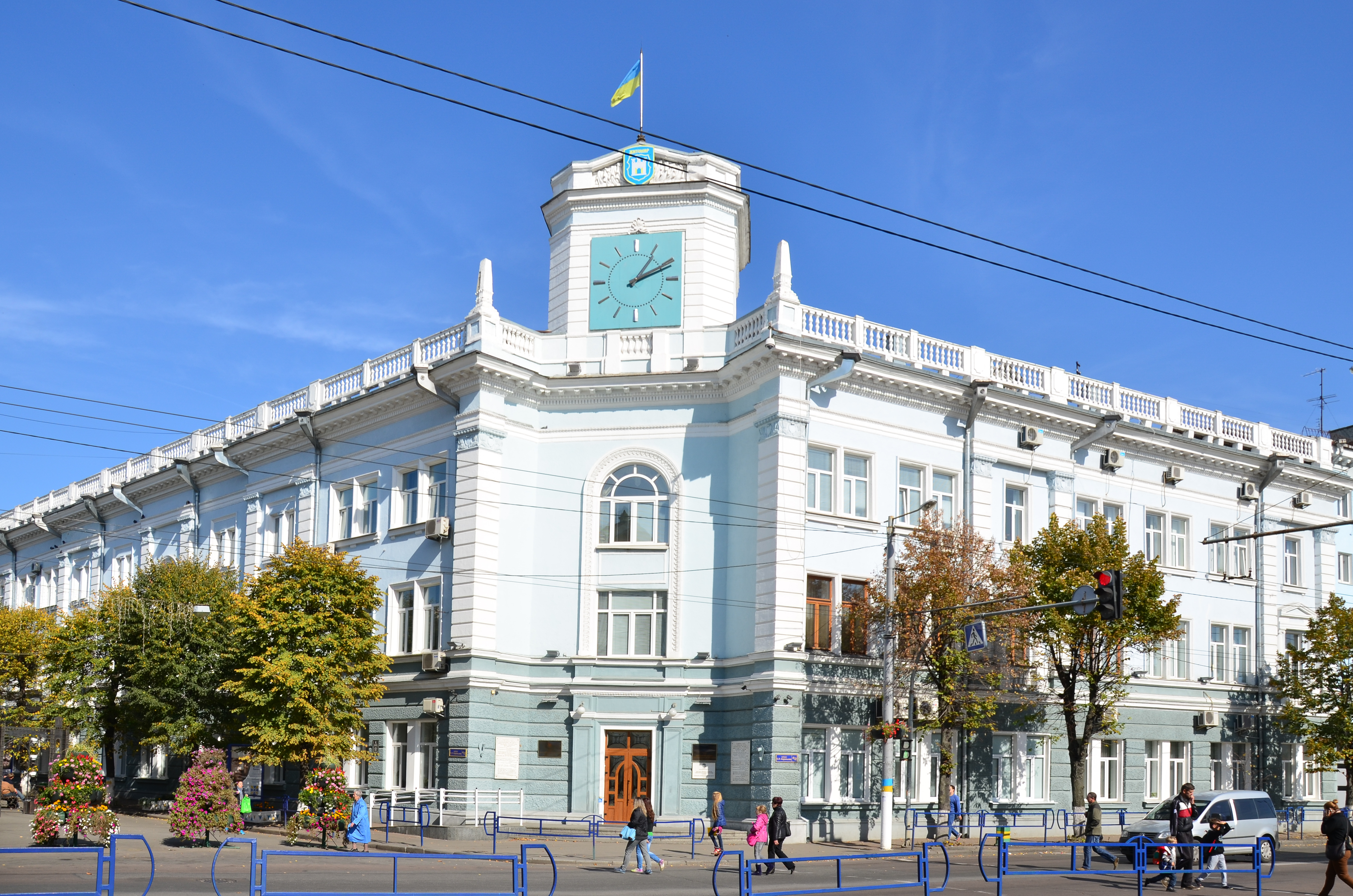
Zhytomyr

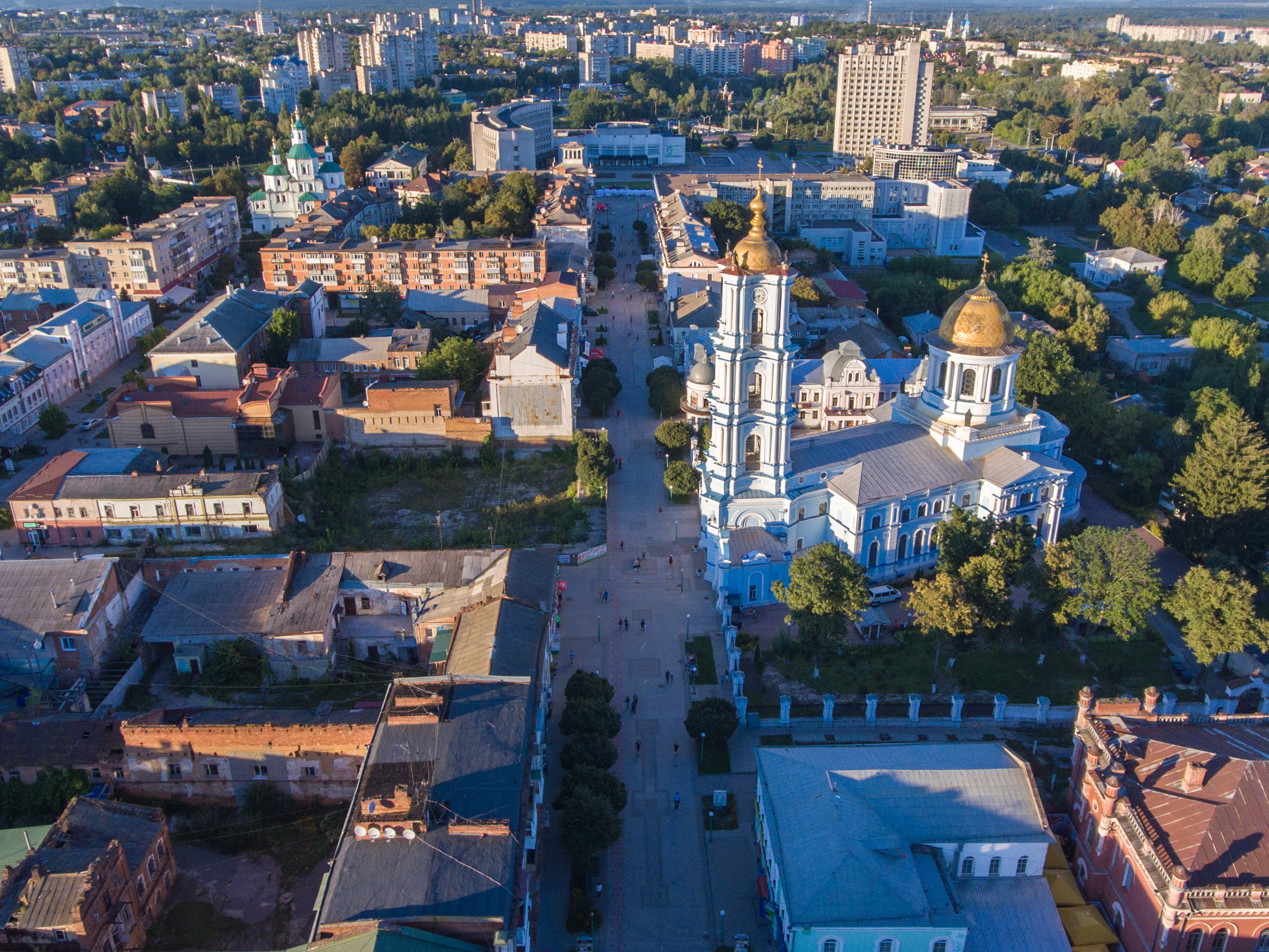
Sumy

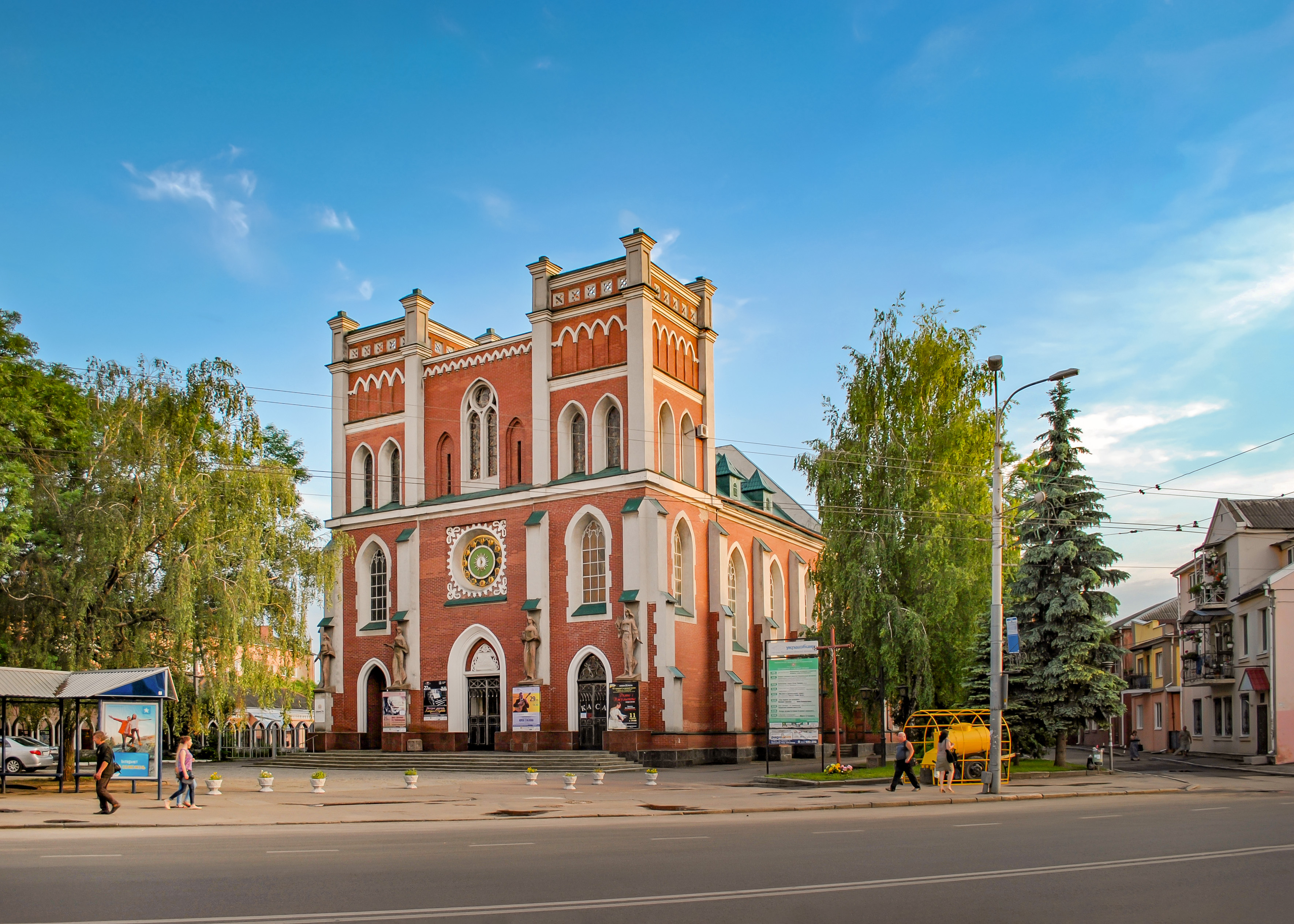
Rivne

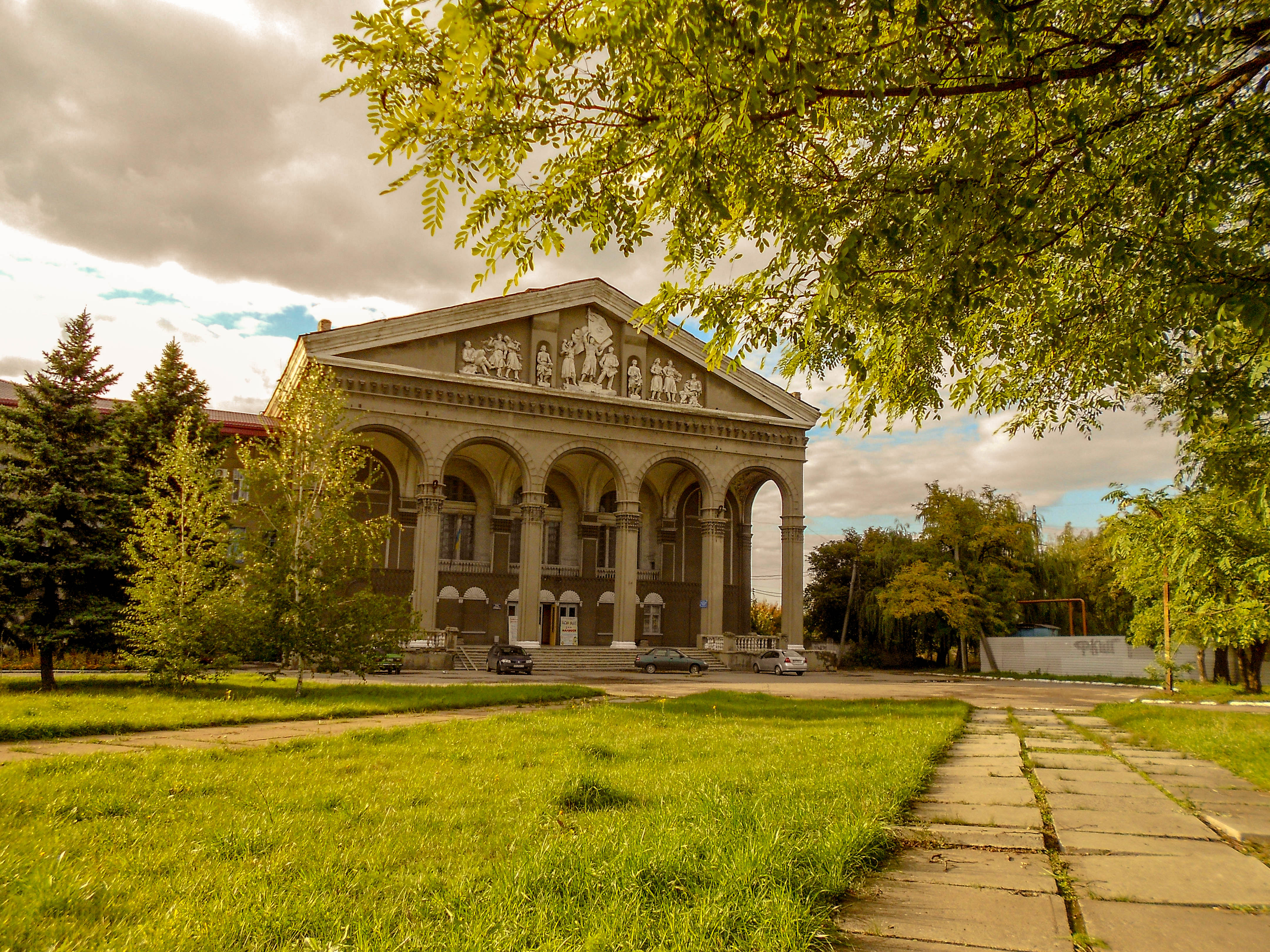
Horlivka

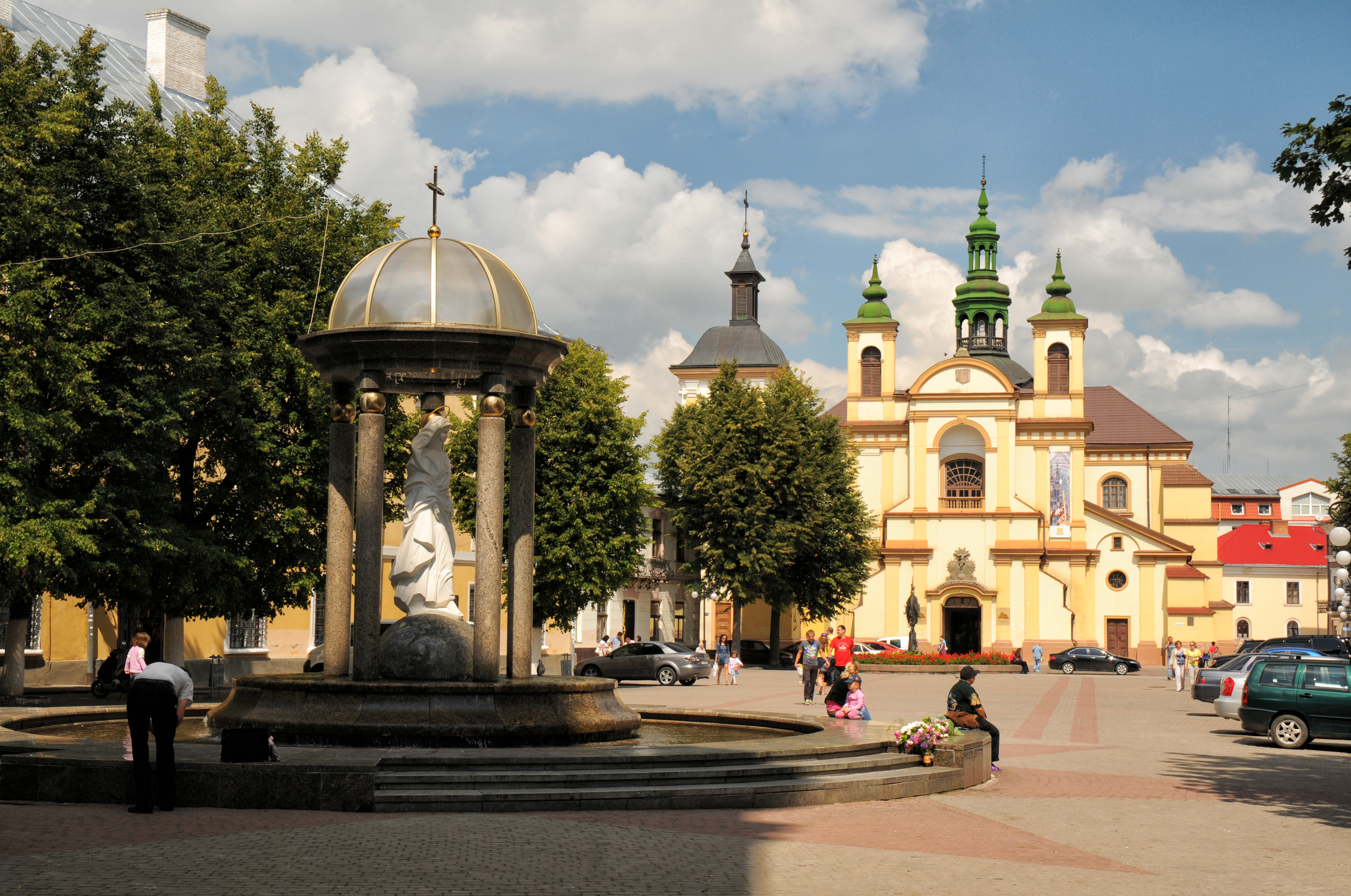
Ivano-Frankivsk

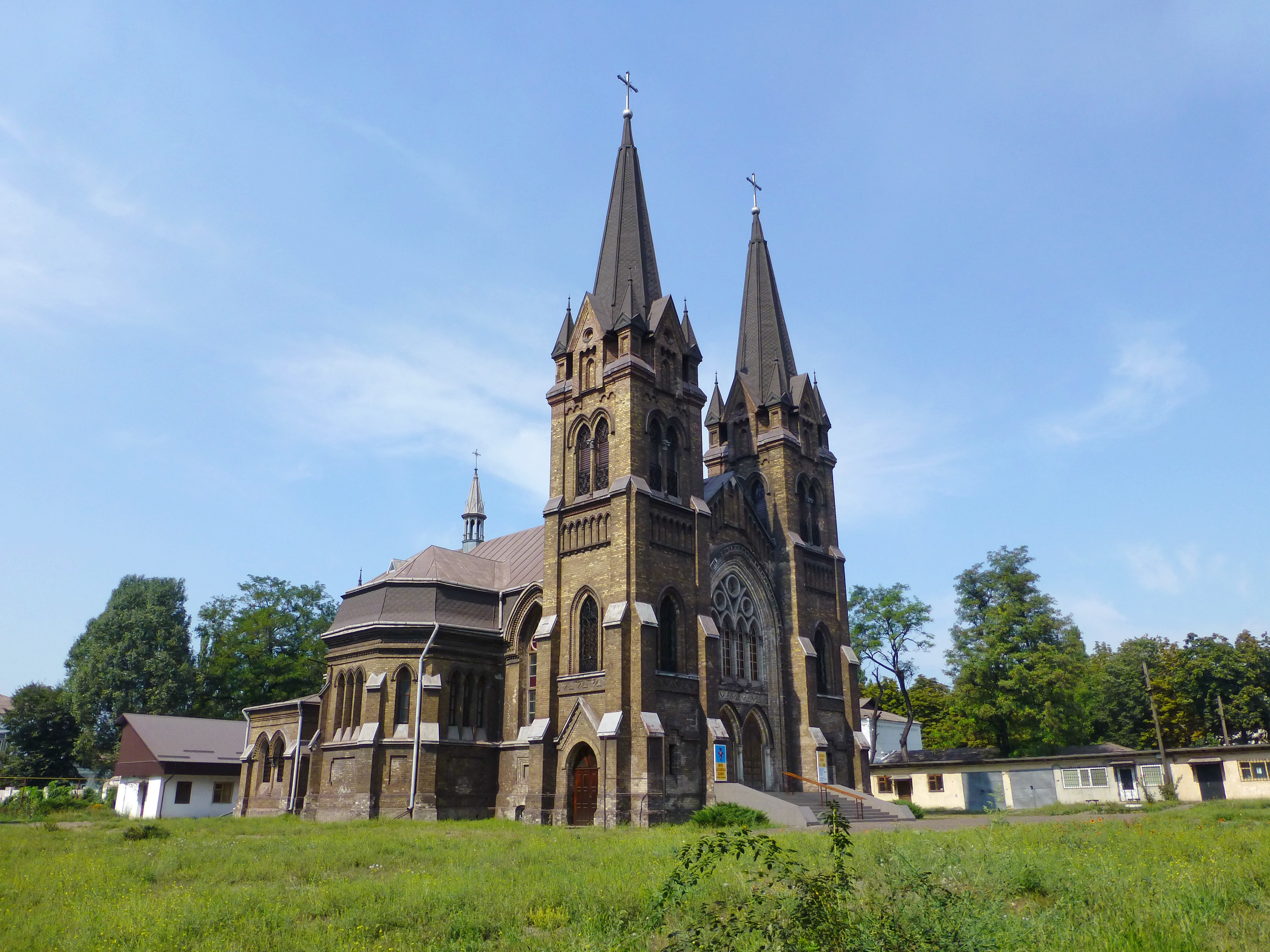
Kamianske

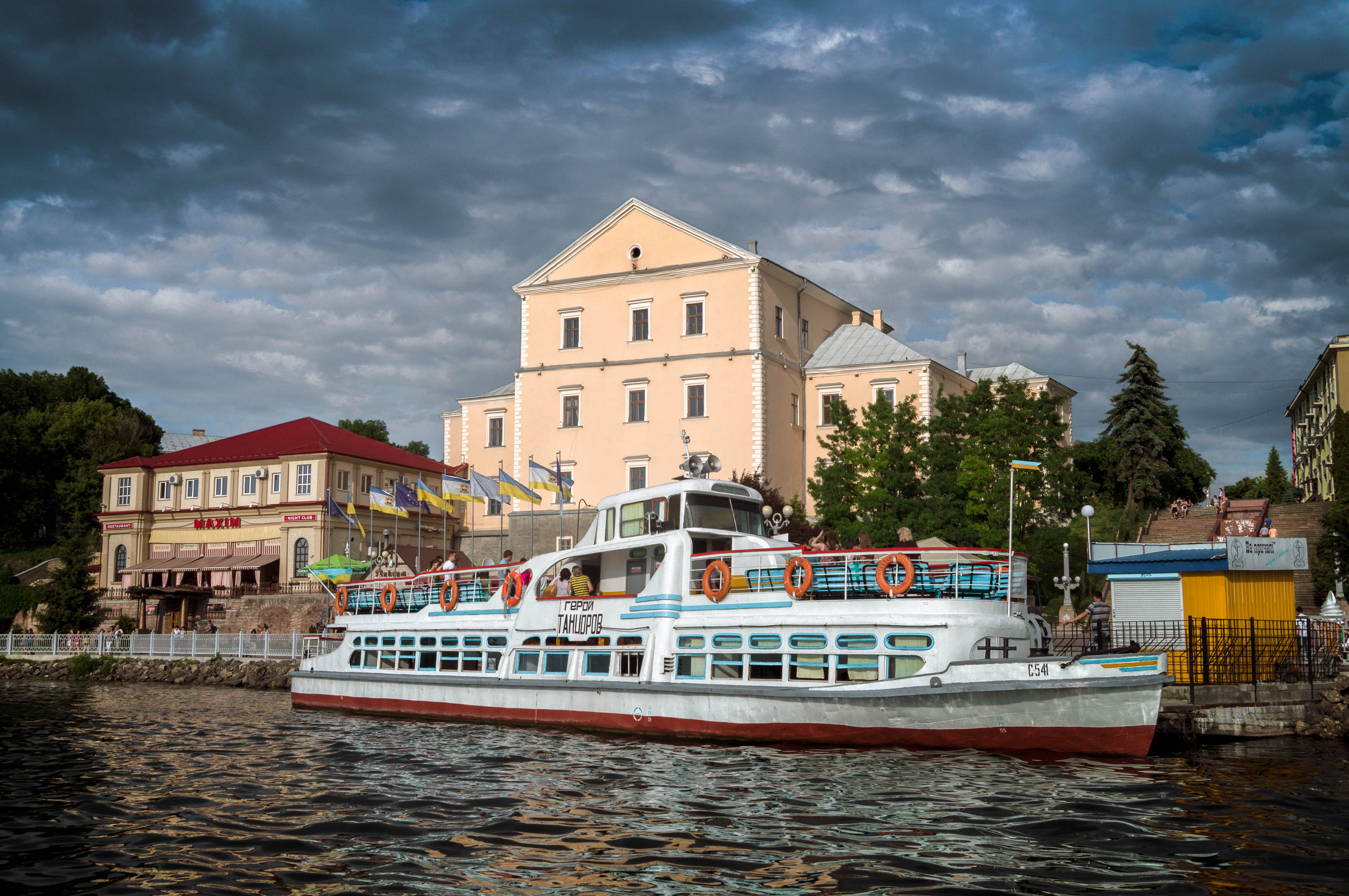
Ternopil

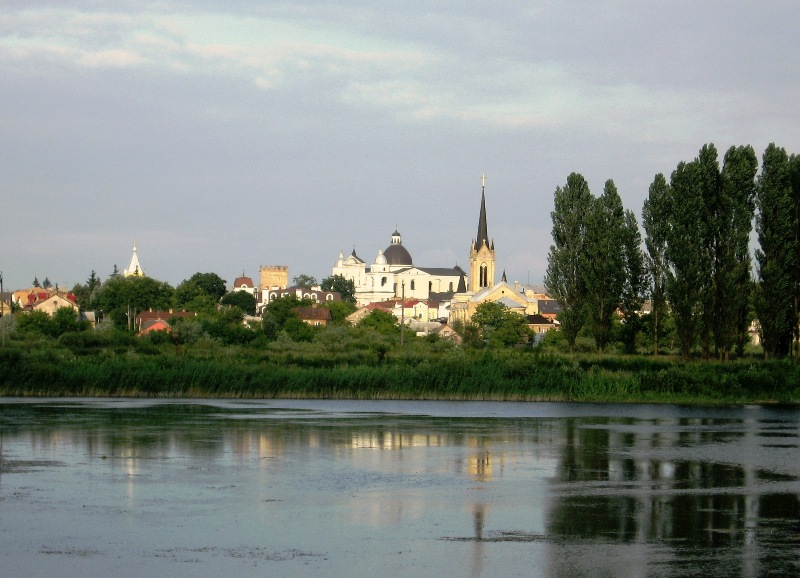
Lutsk

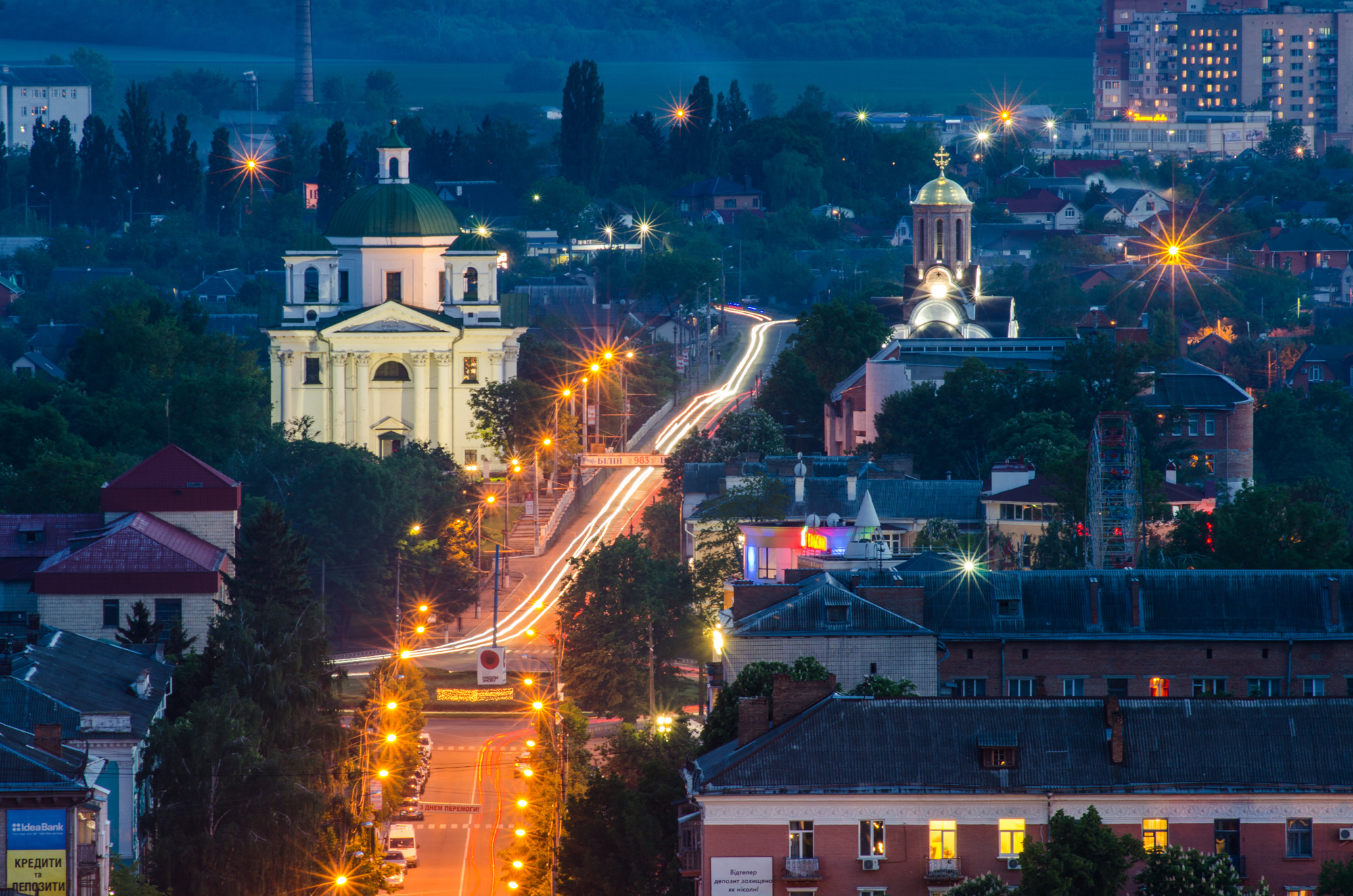
Bila Tserkva

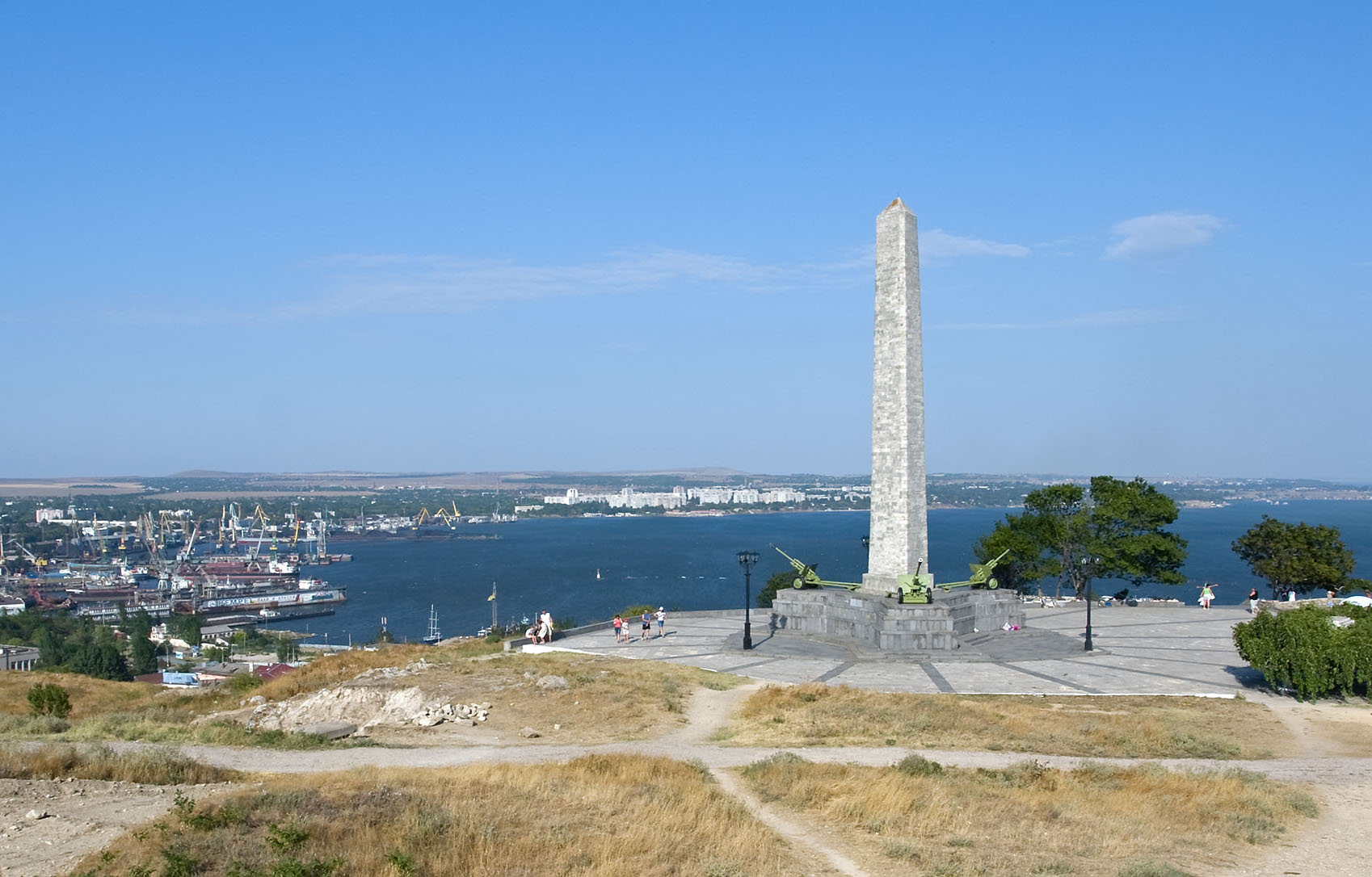
Kerch

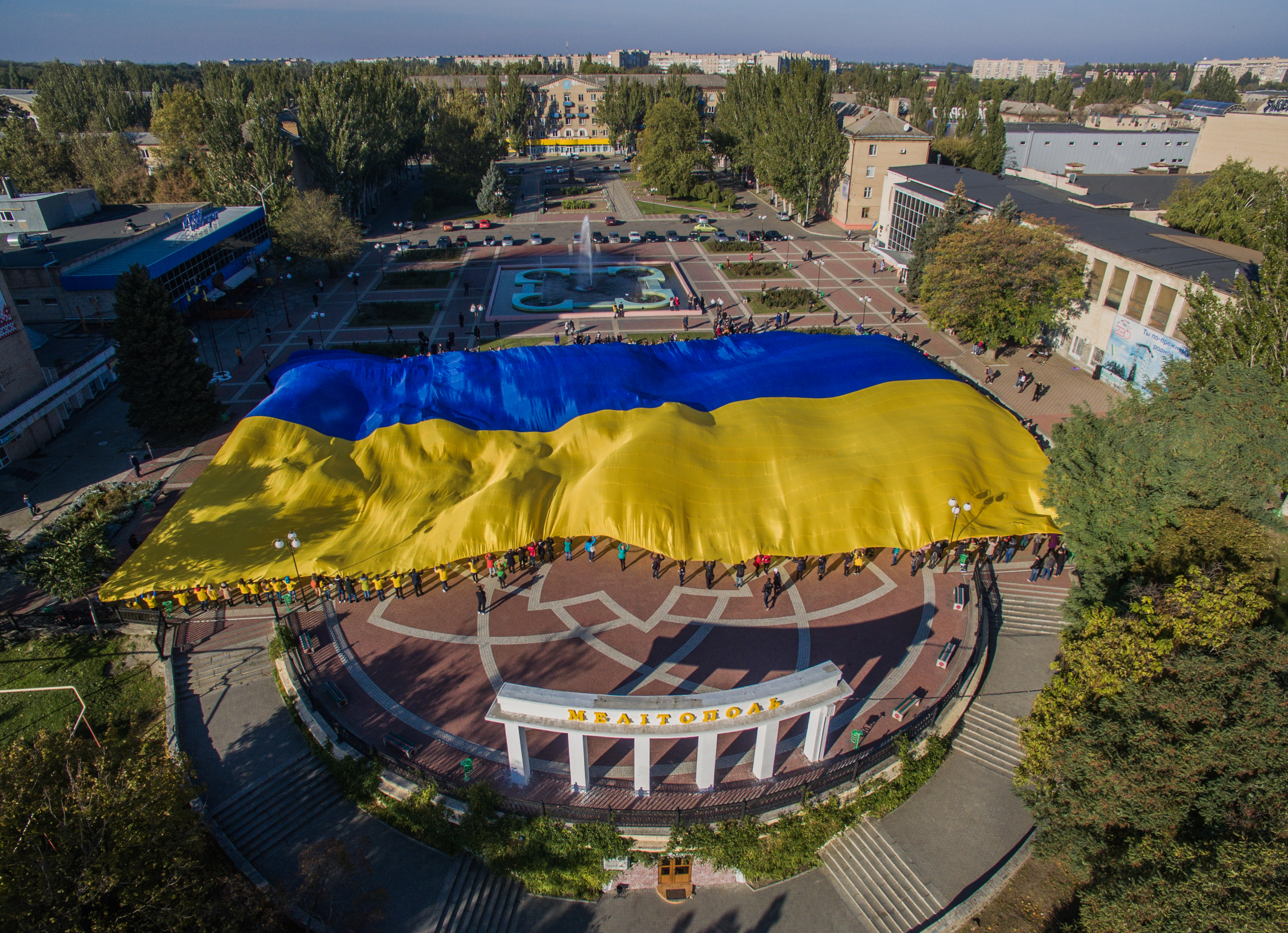
Melitopol

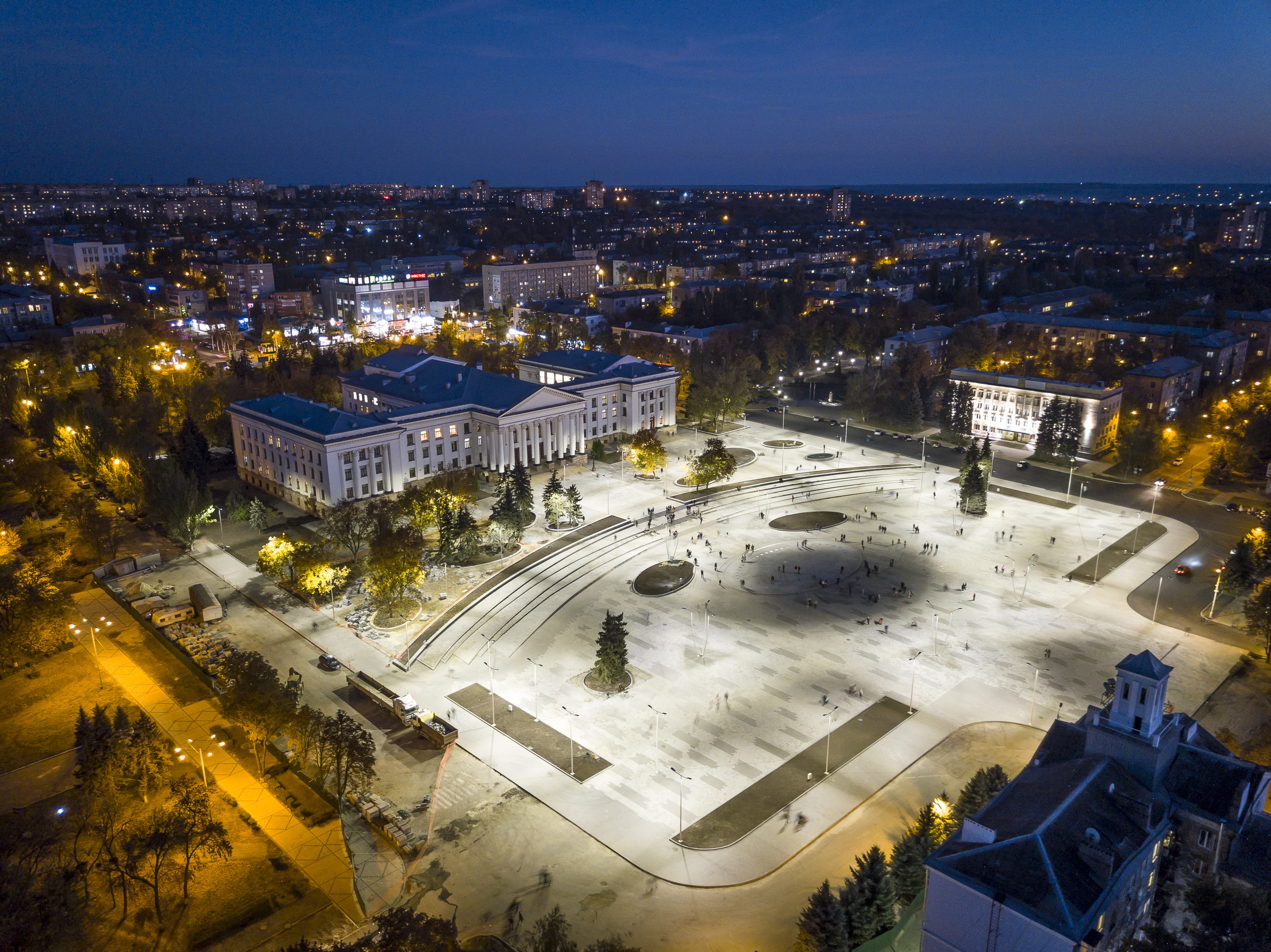
Kramatorsk

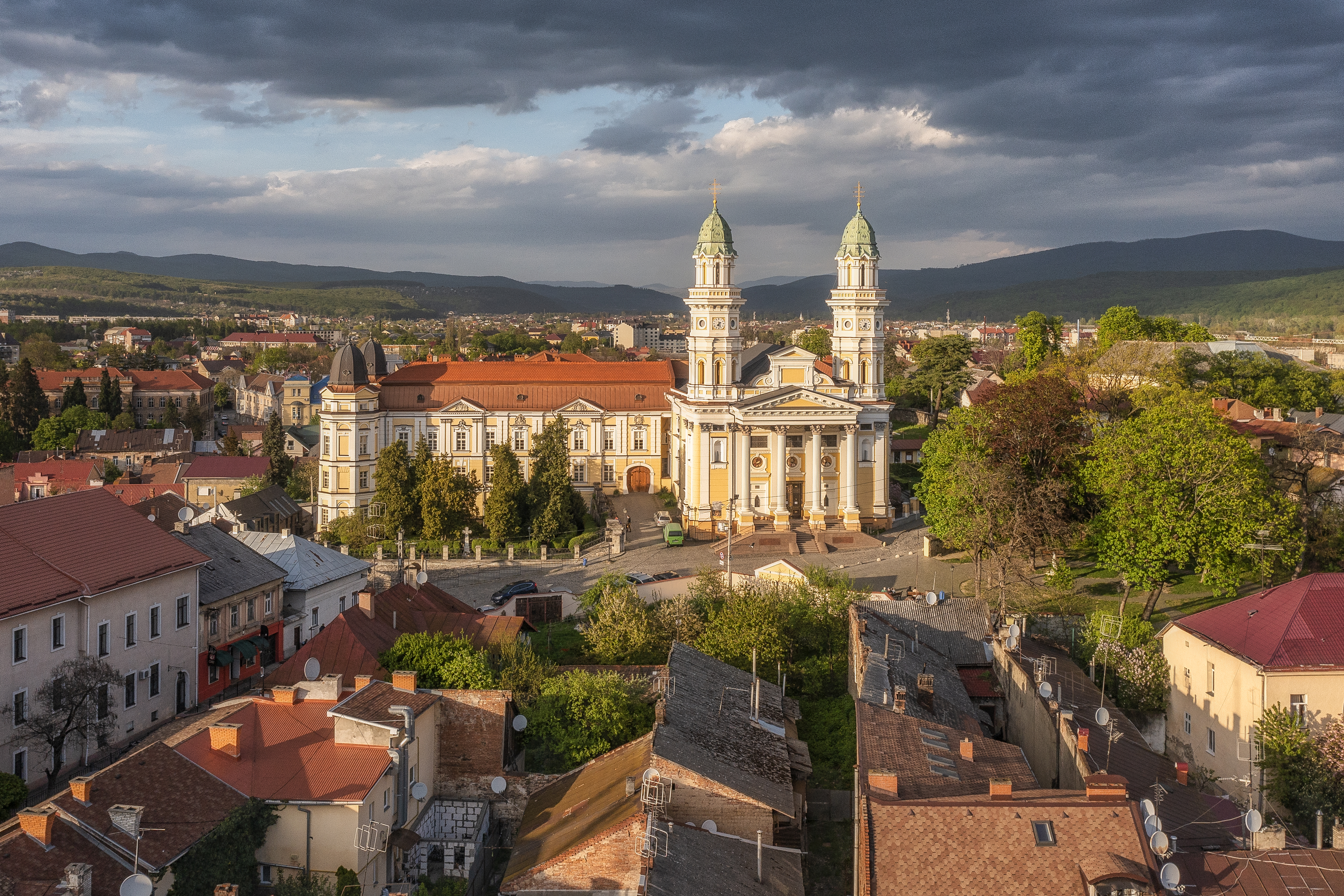
Uzhhorod

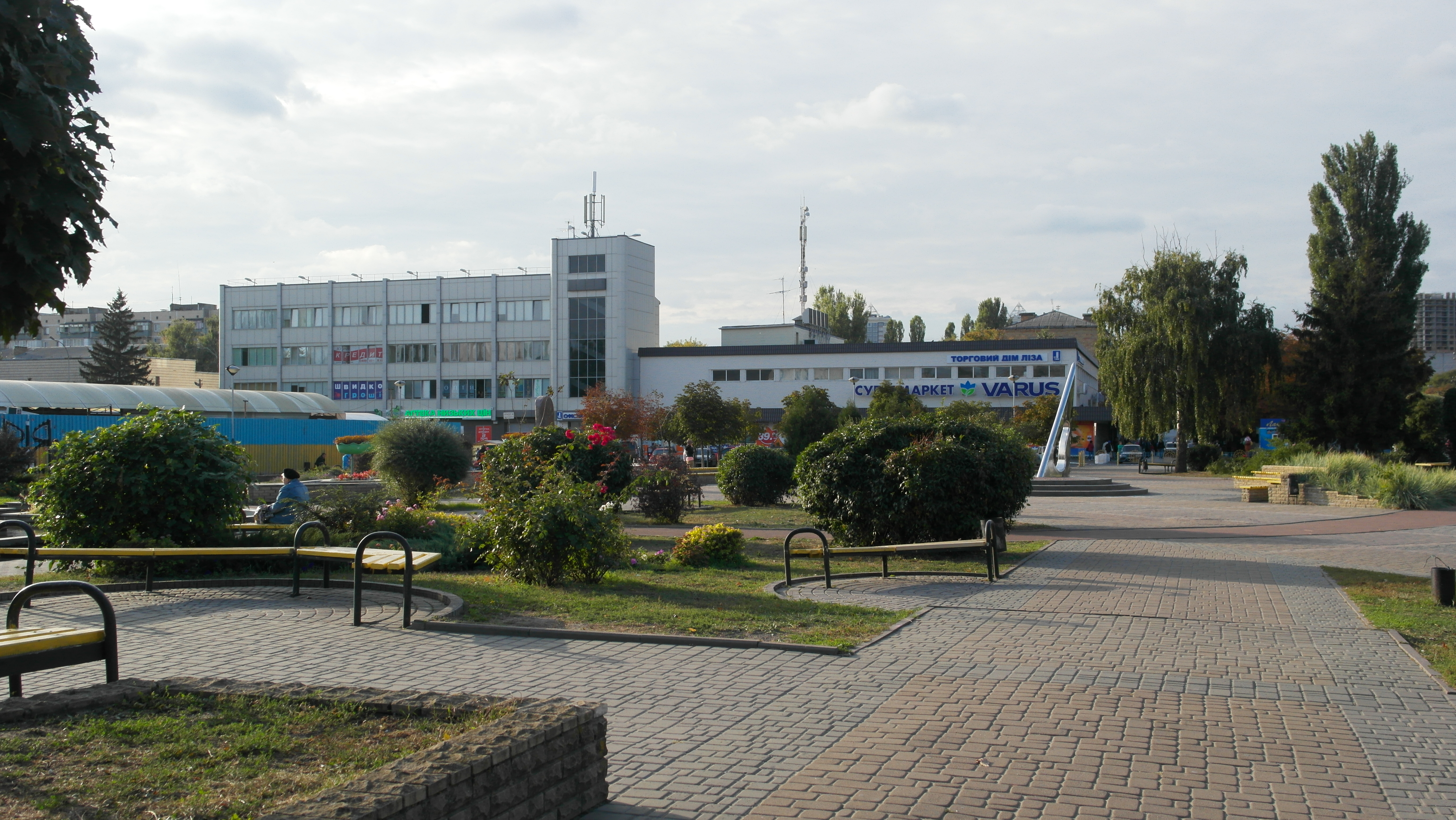
Brovary

Yevpatoria

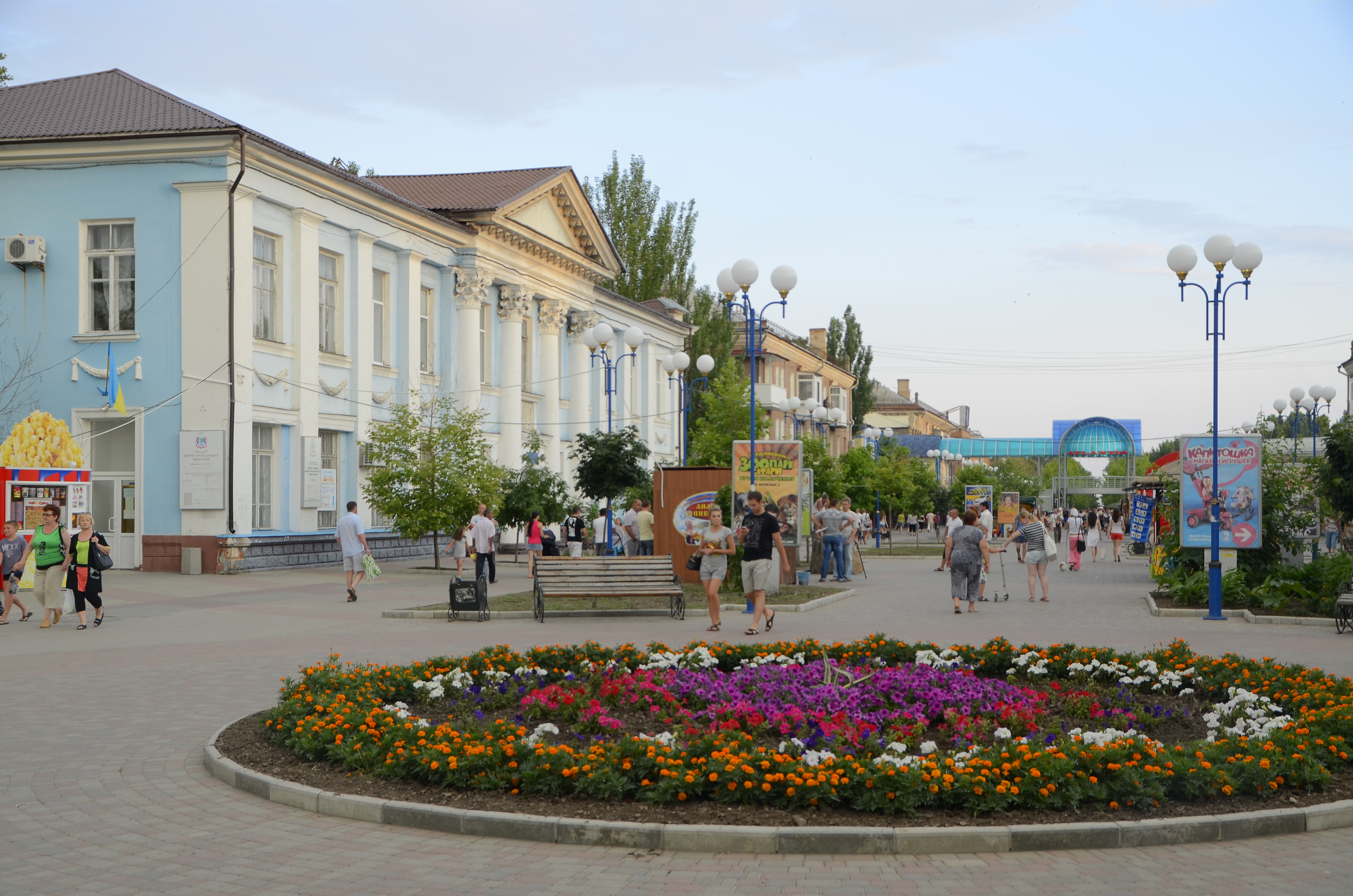
Berdiansk

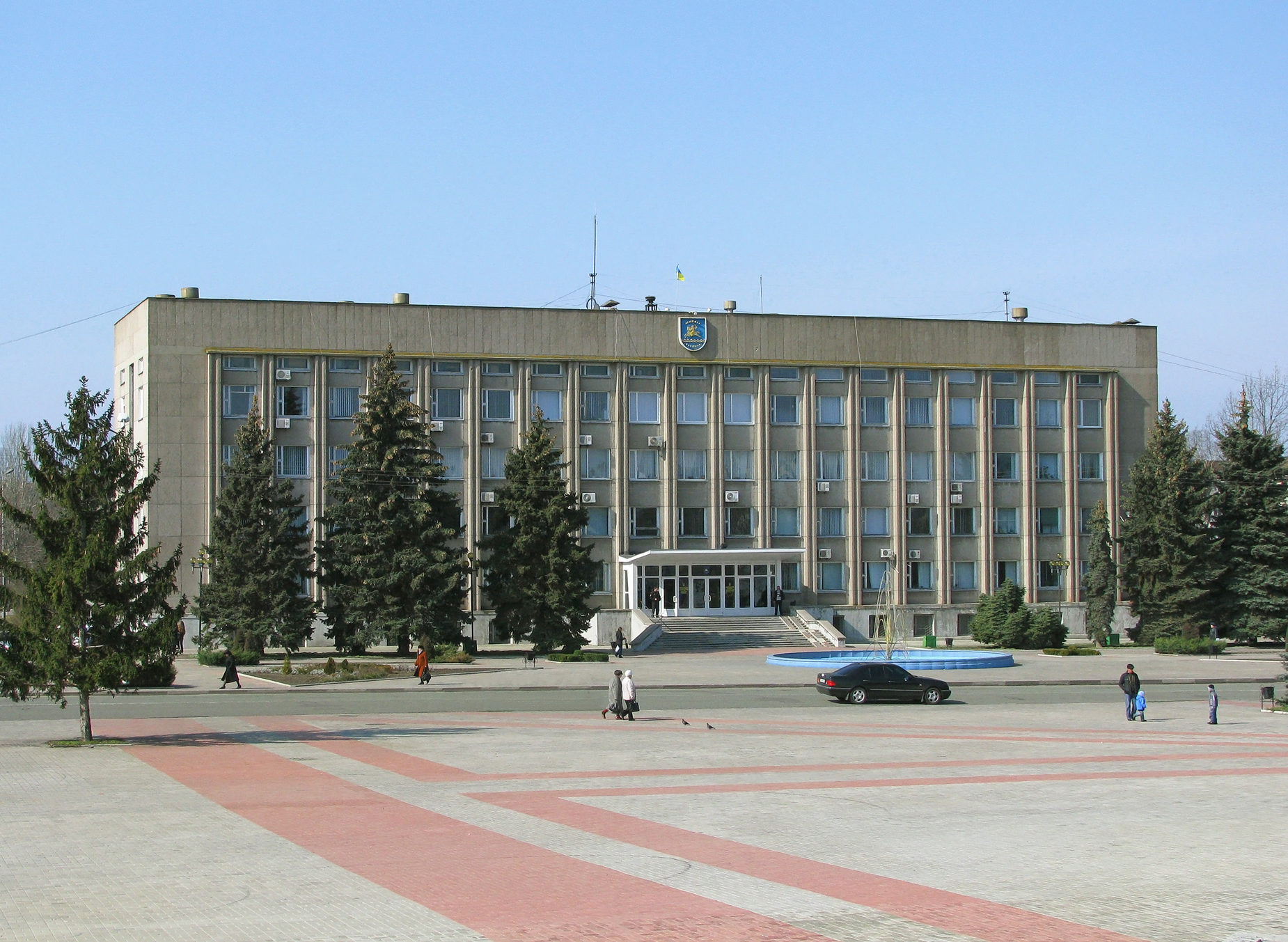
Nikopol

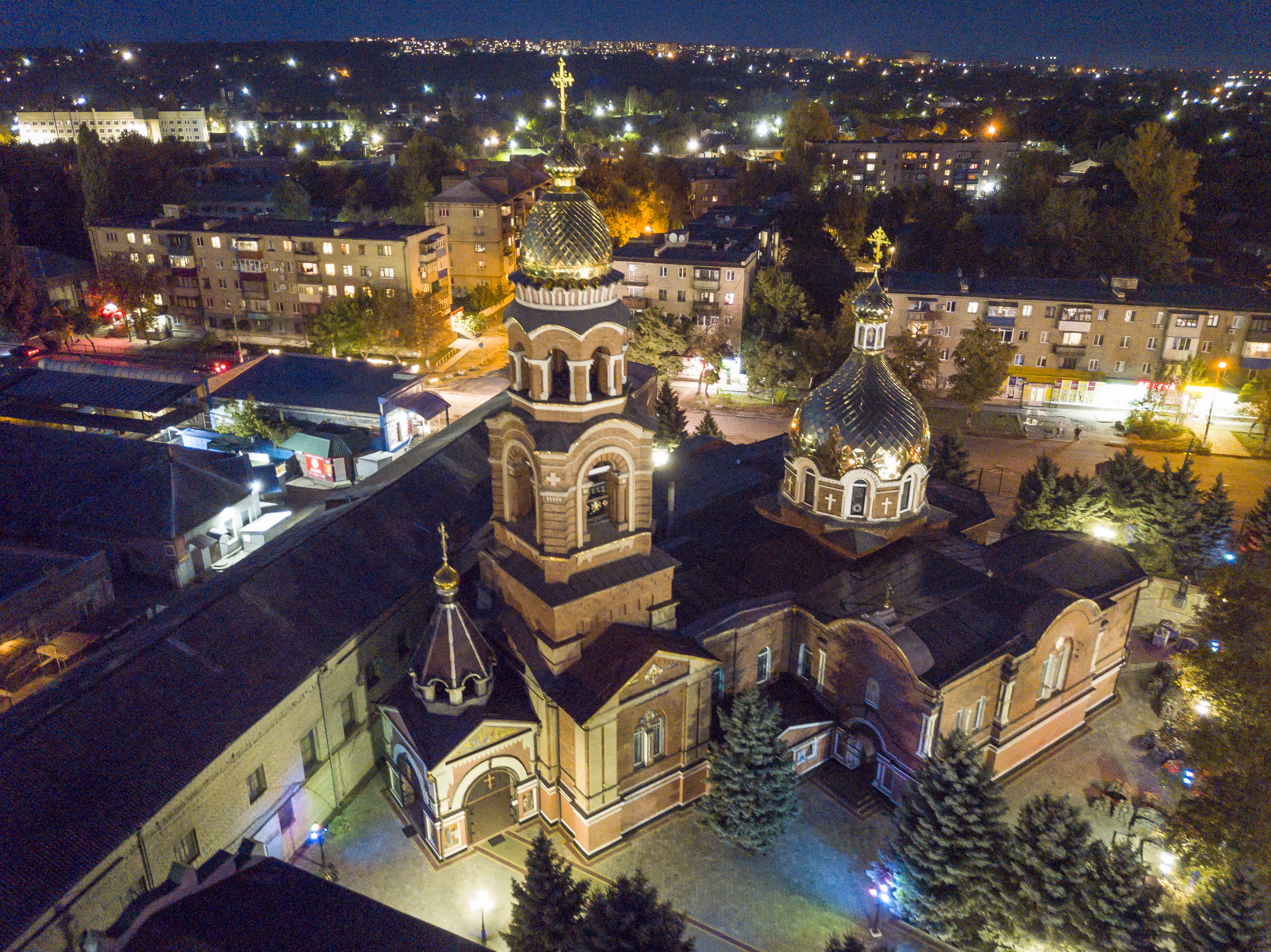
Sloviansk

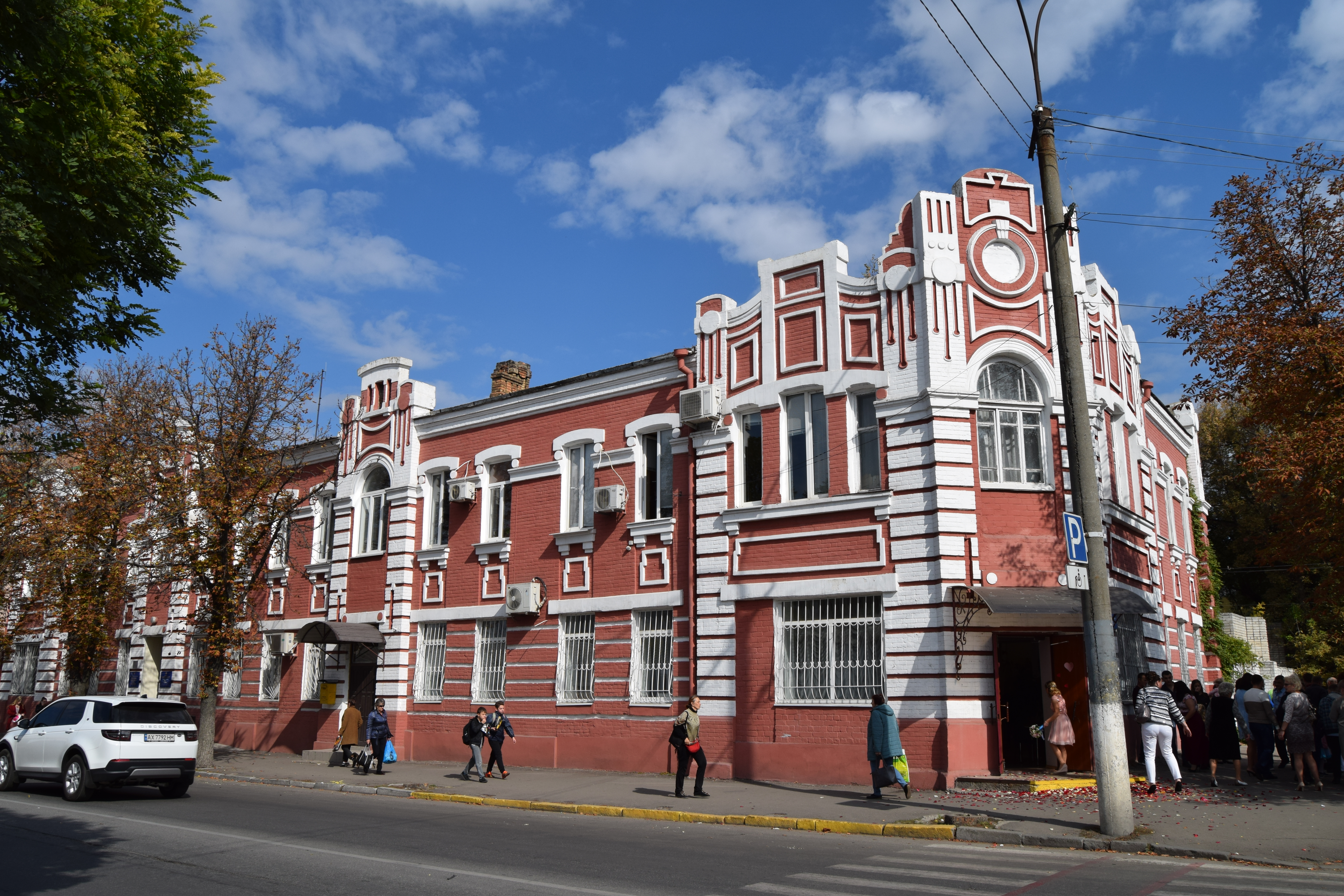
Pavlohrad

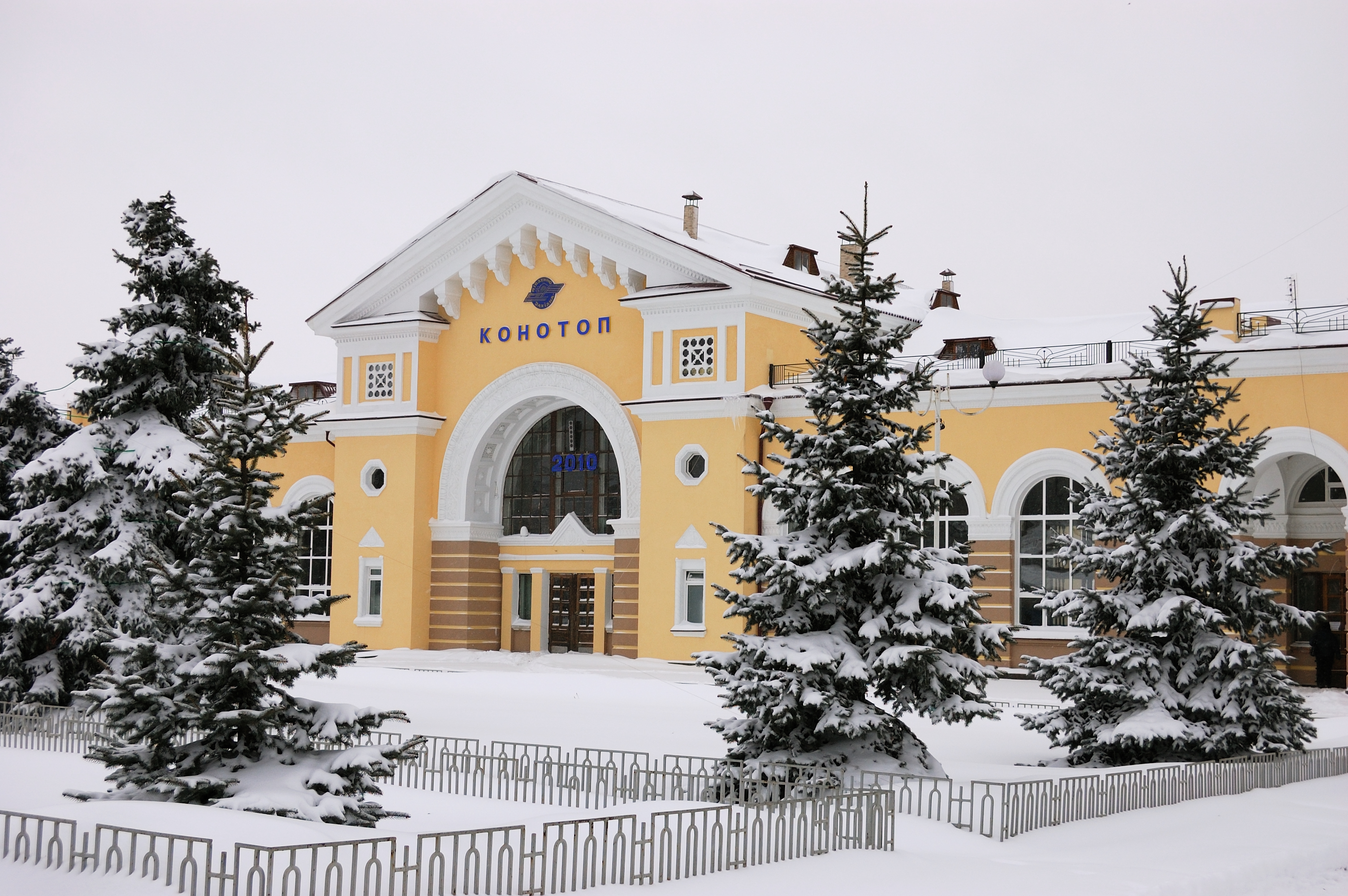
Konotop

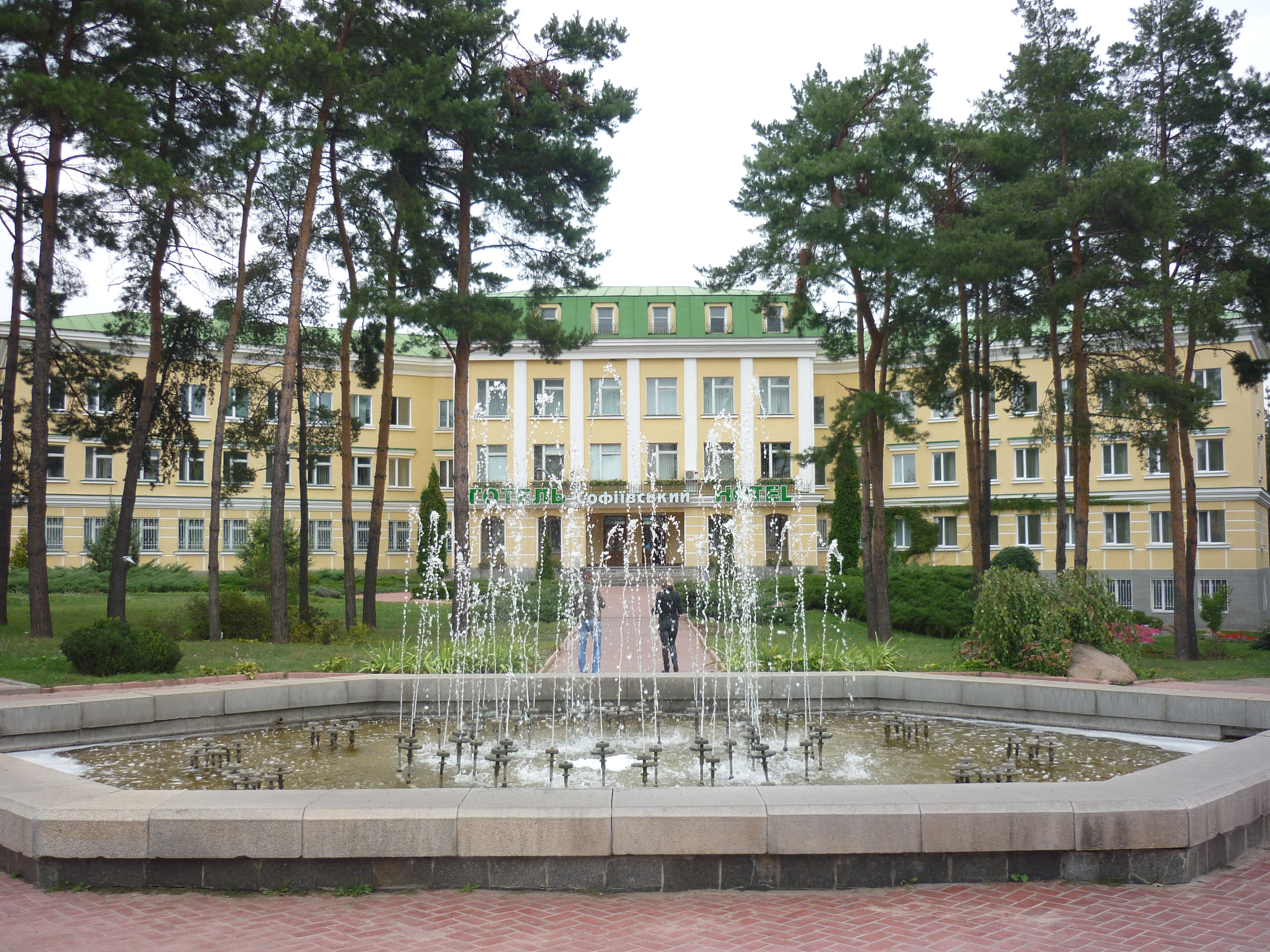
Uman

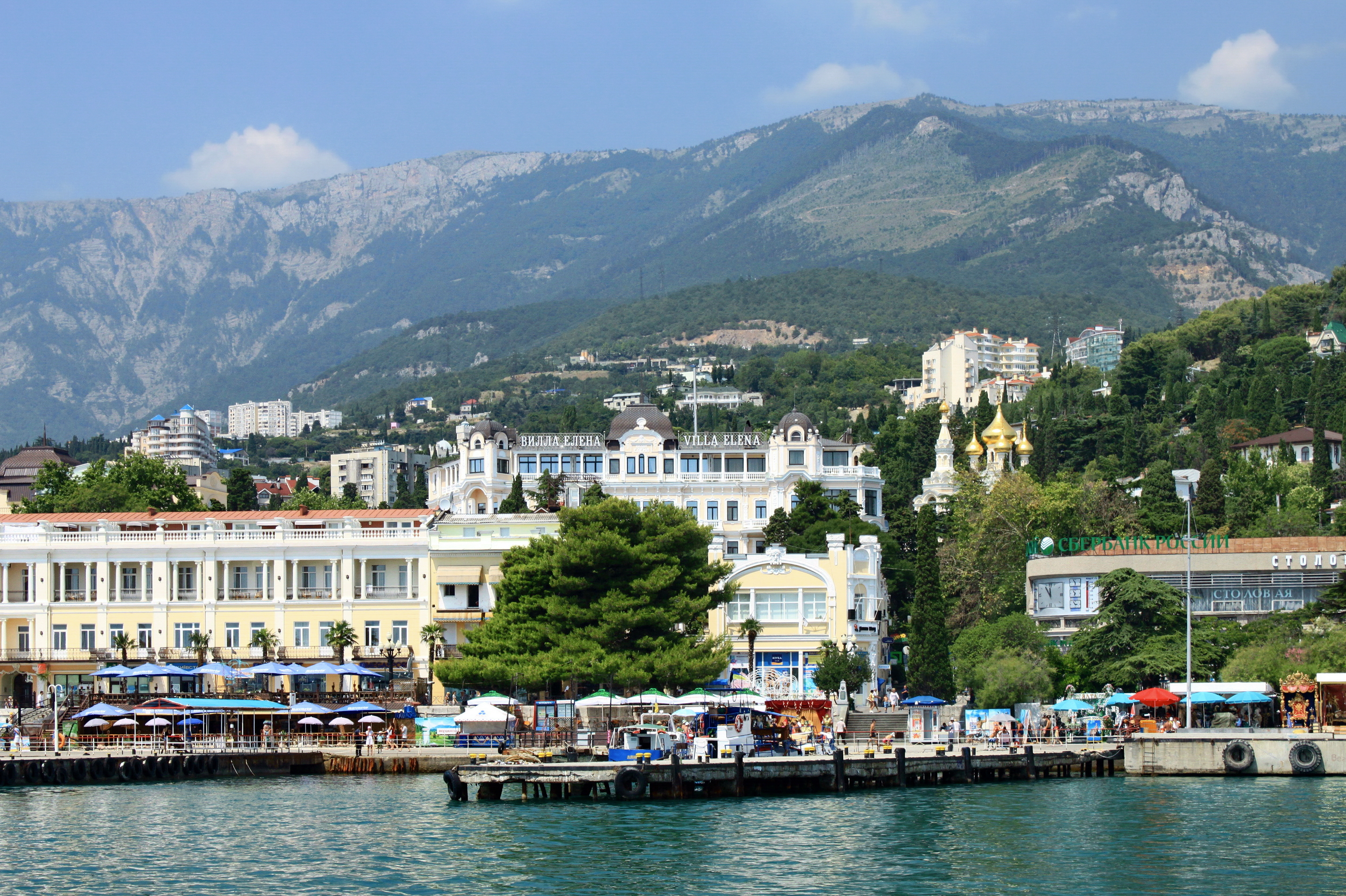
Yalta

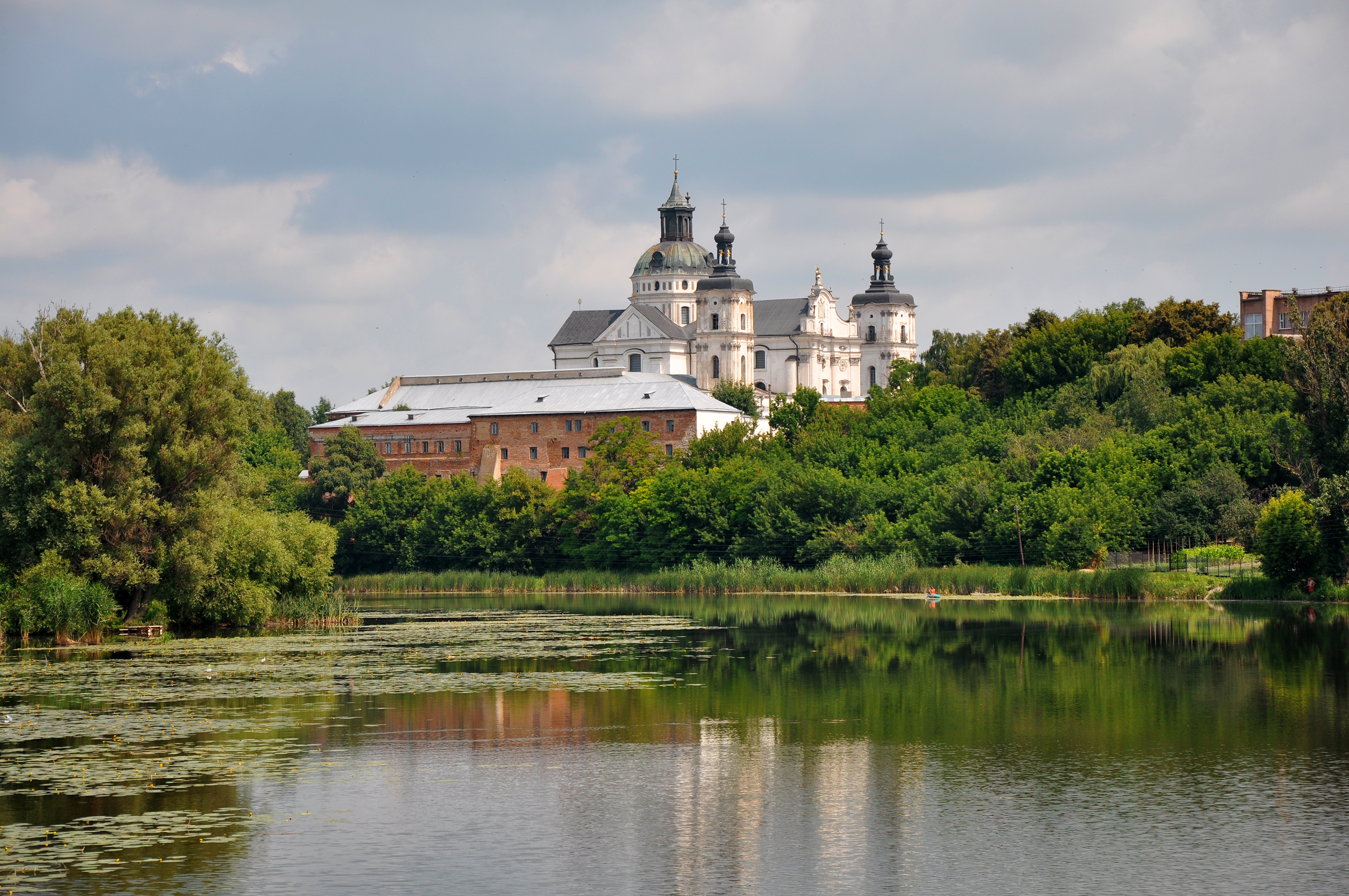
Berdychiv

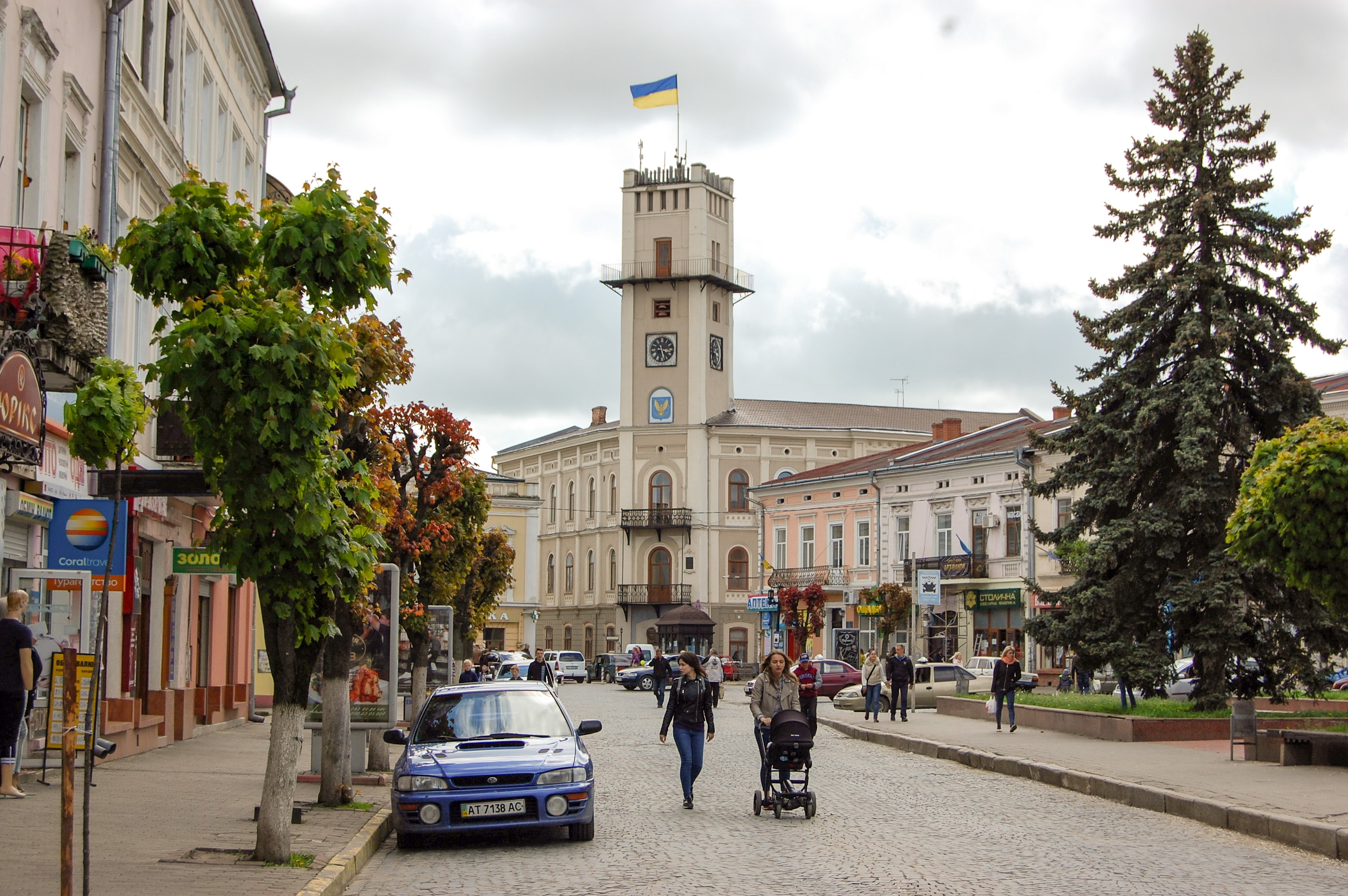
Kolomyia

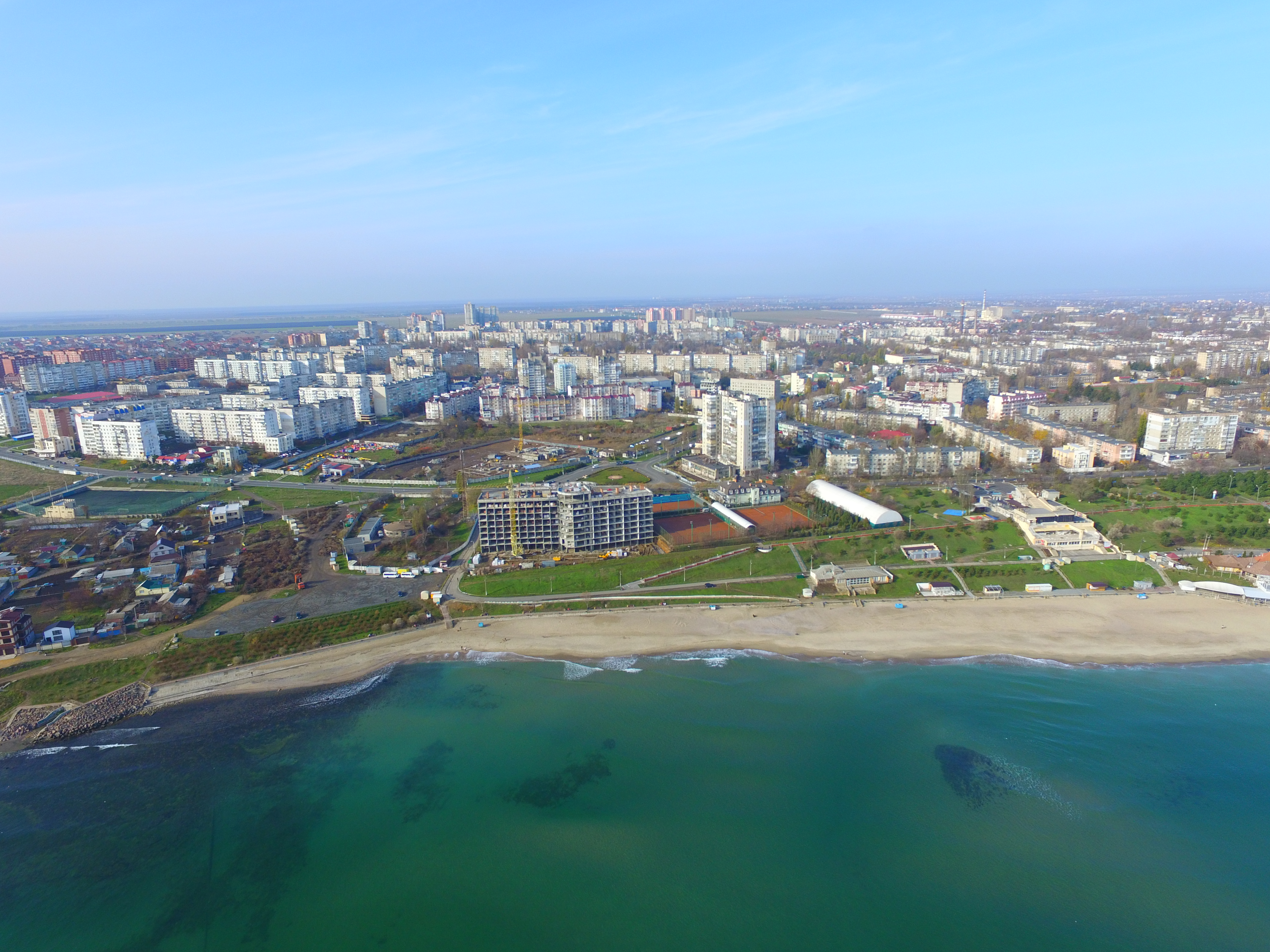
Chornomorsk

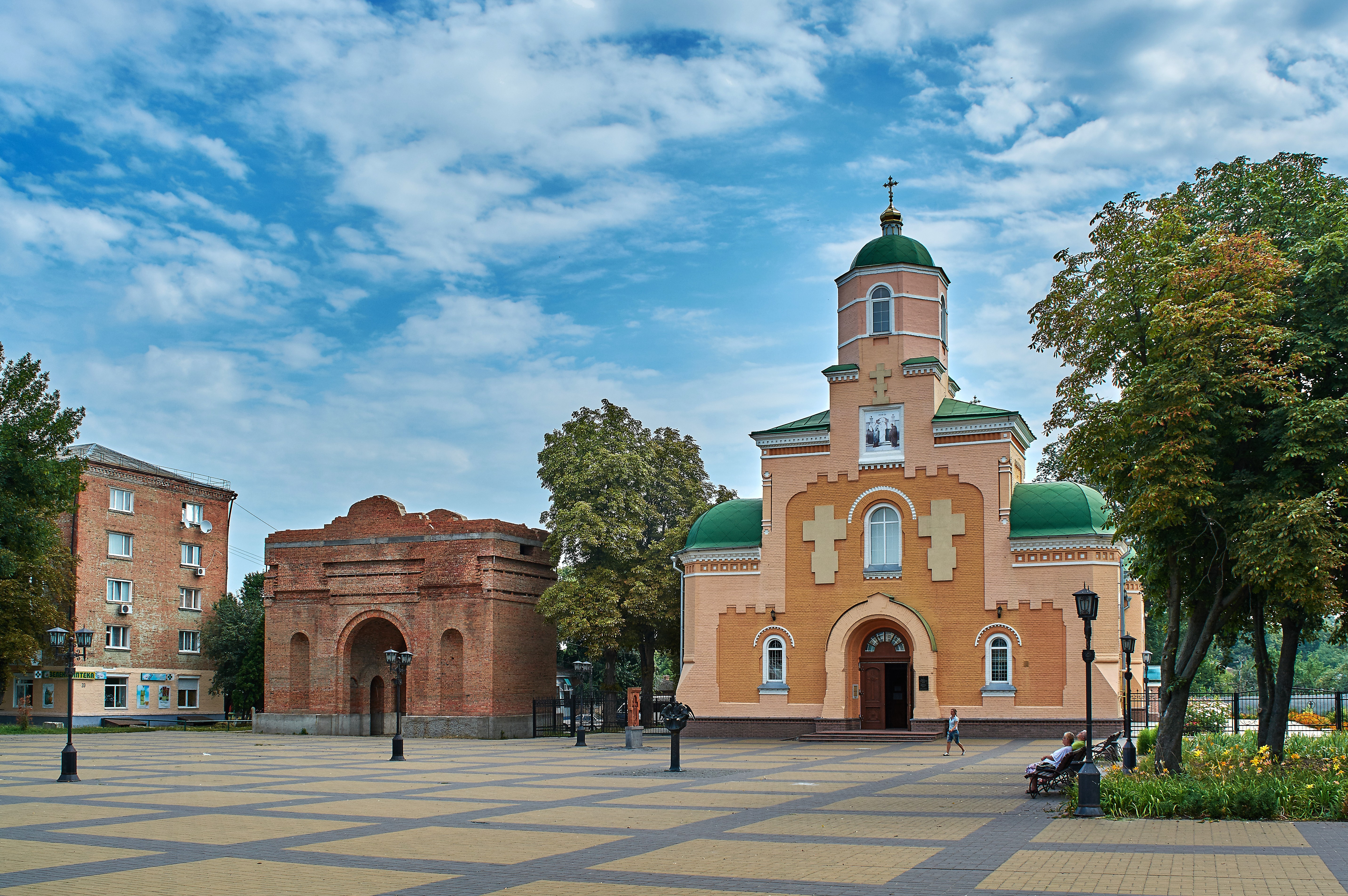
Pryluky

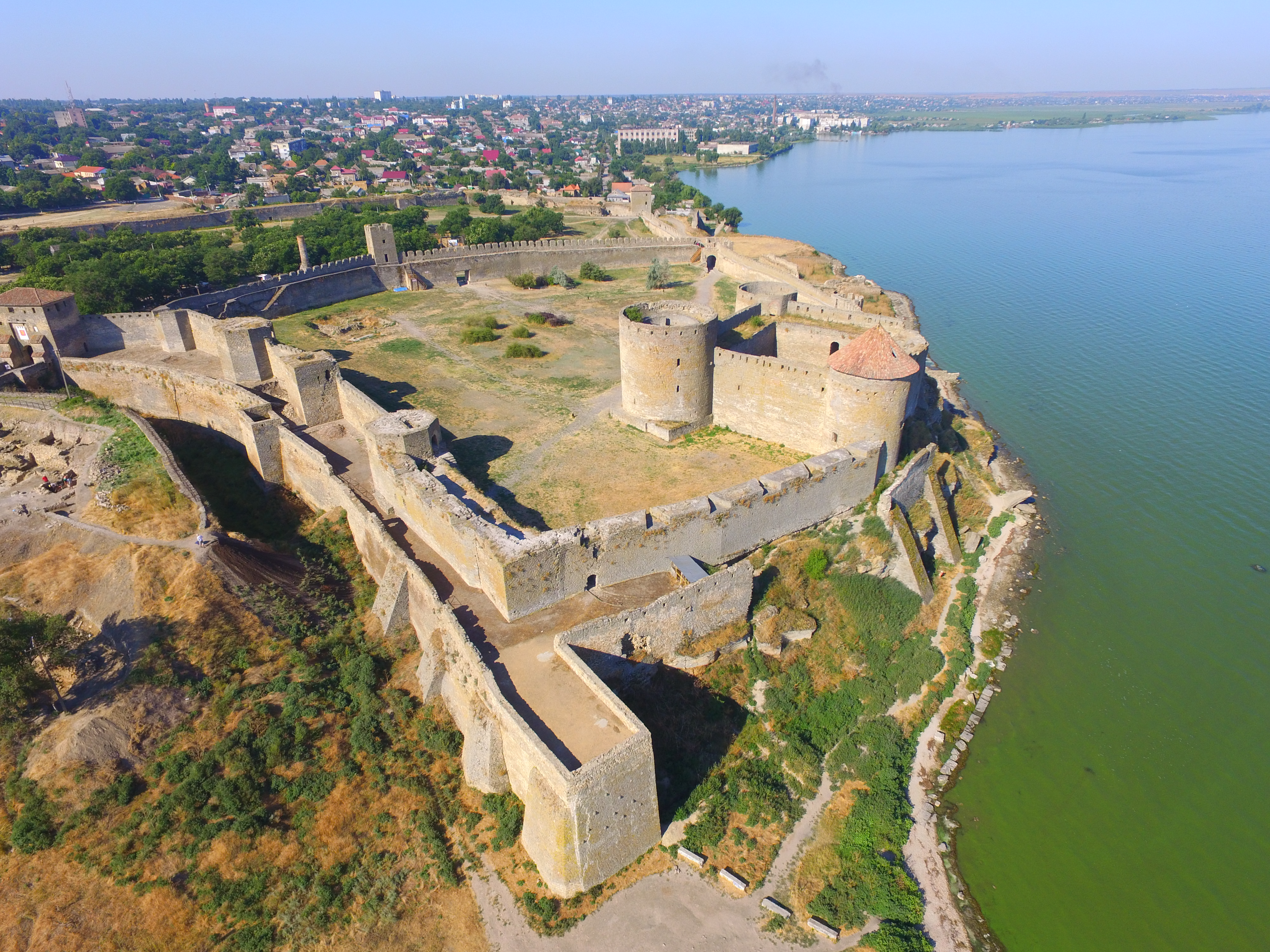
Bilhorod-Dnistrovskyi

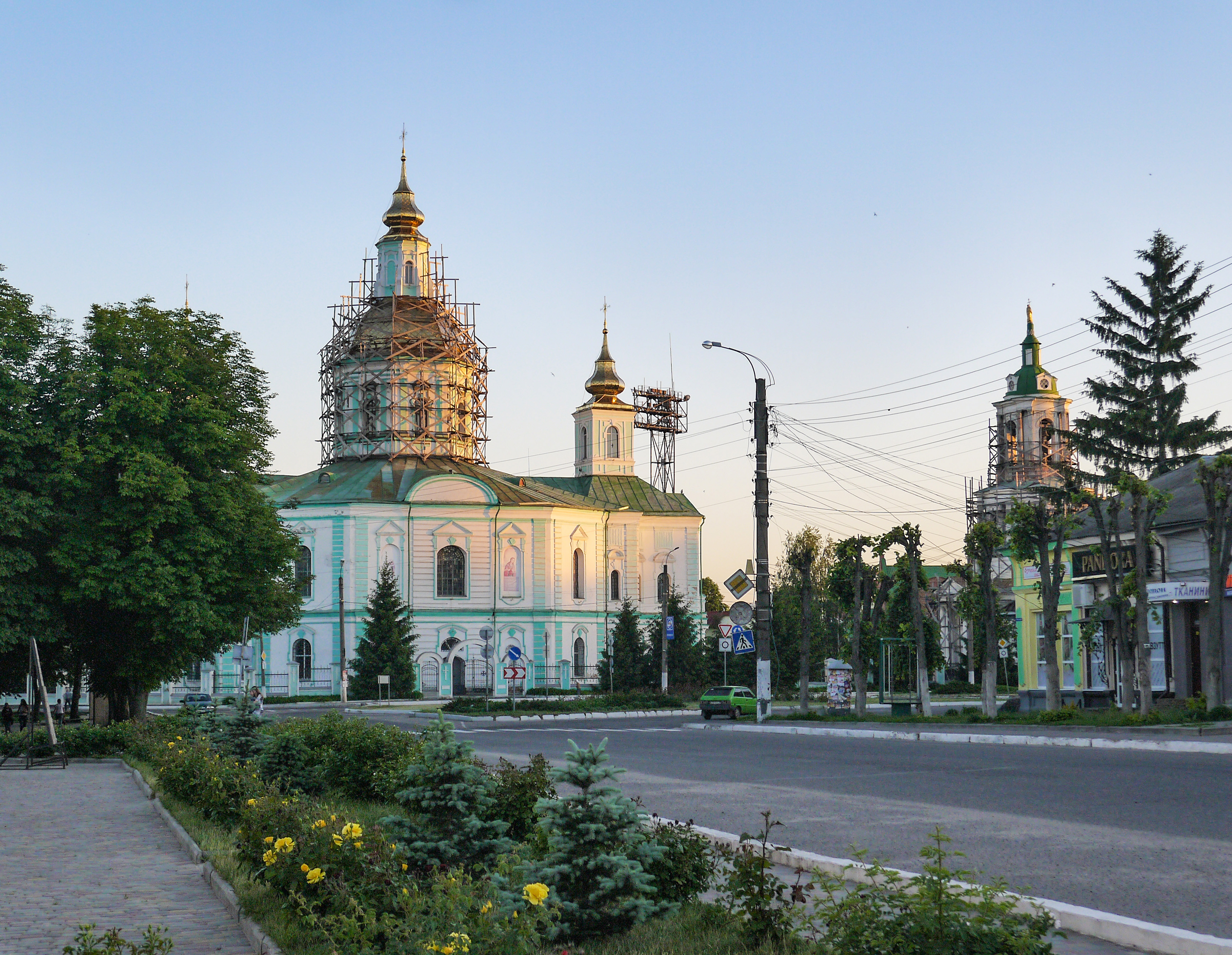
Okhtyrka

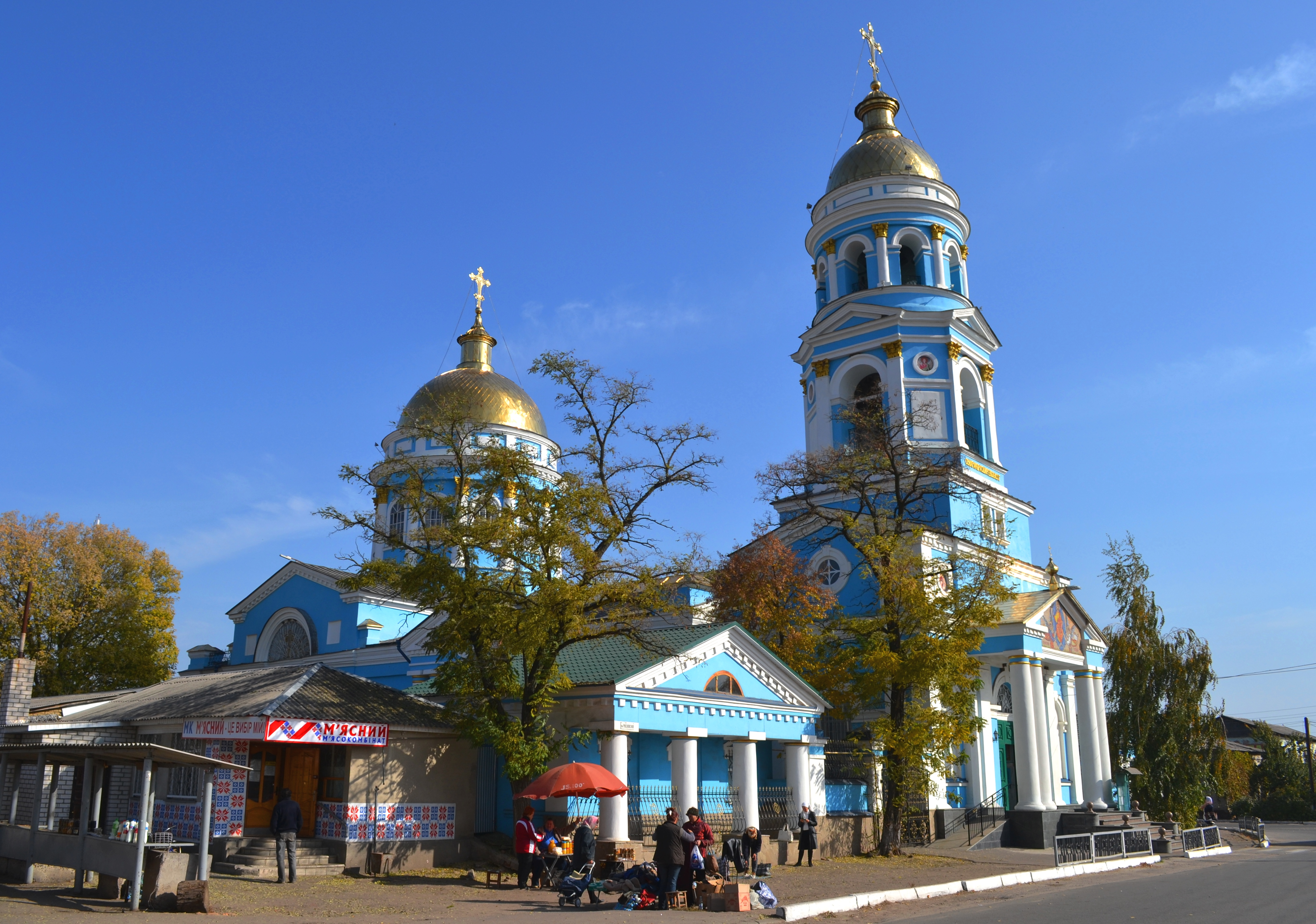
Izium

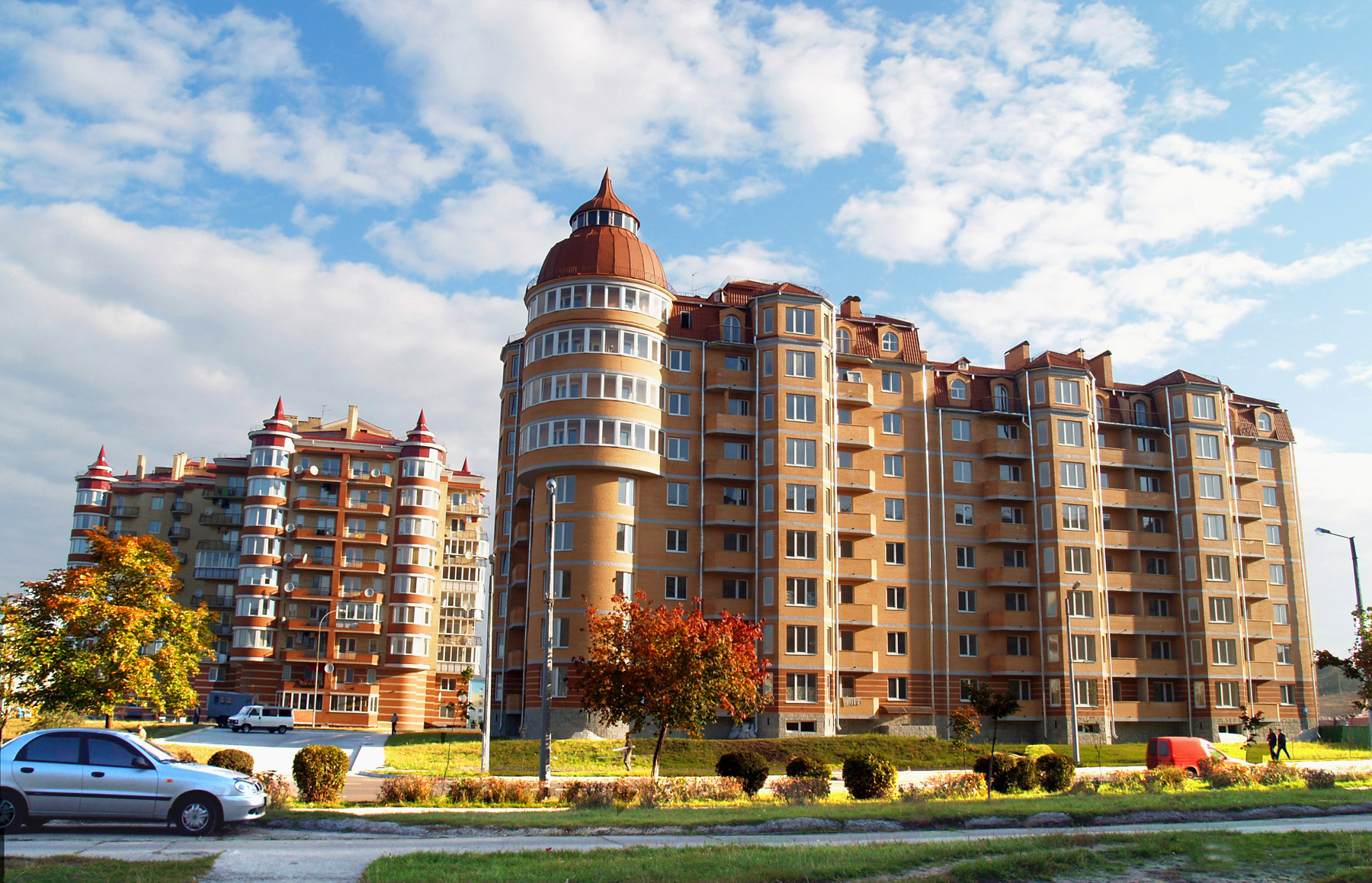
Varash

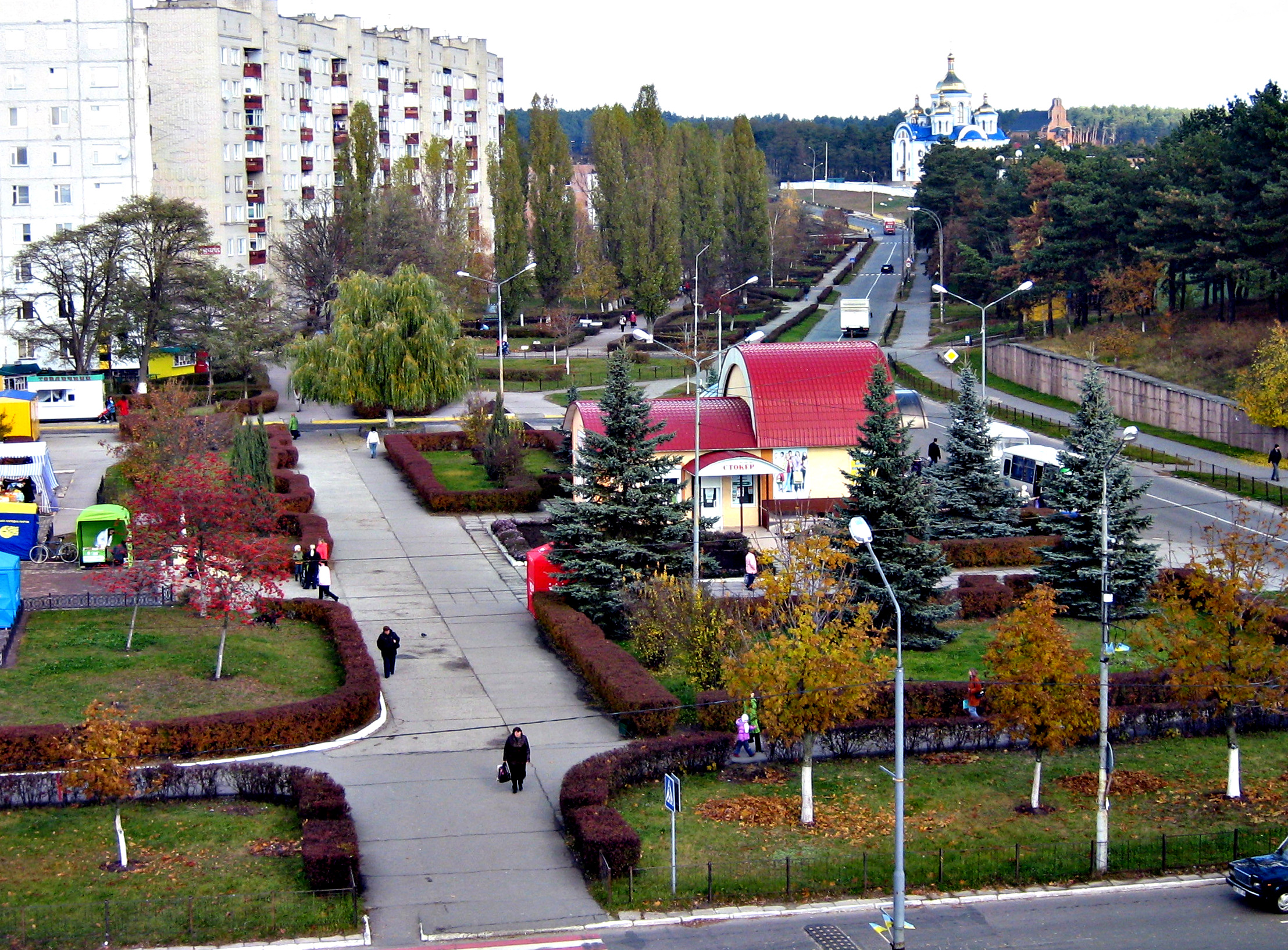
Netishyn

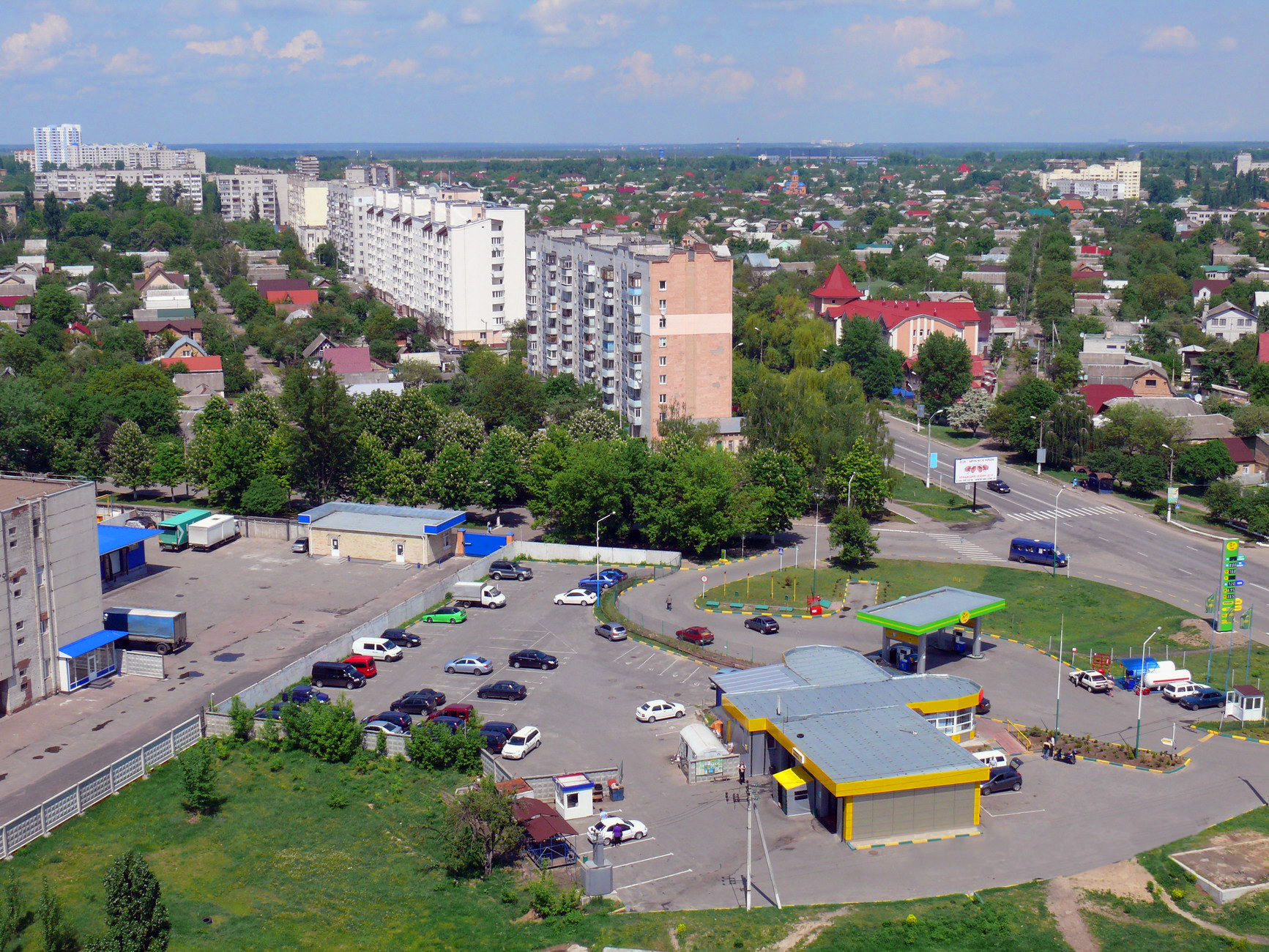
Boiarka

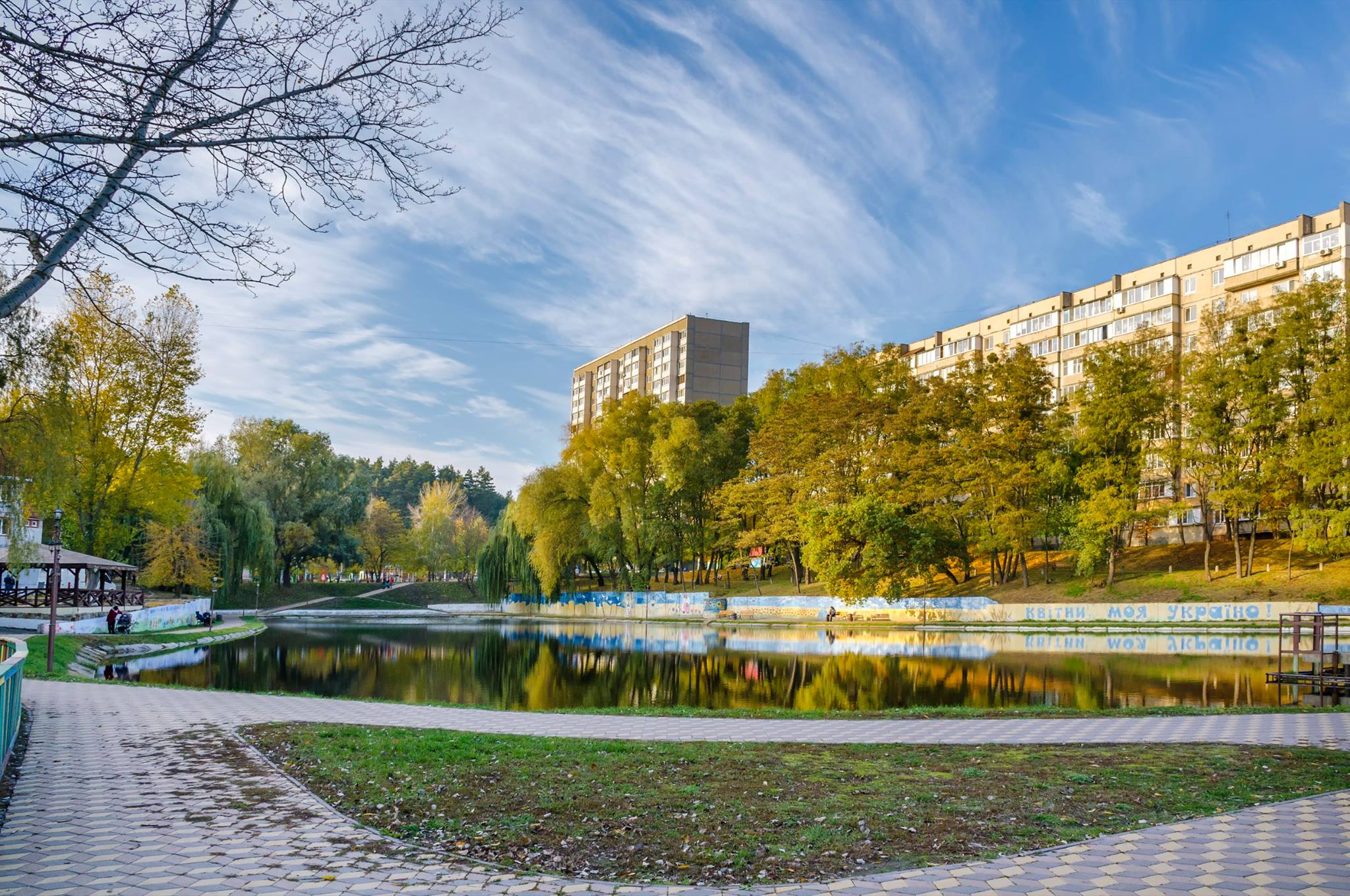
Obukhiv

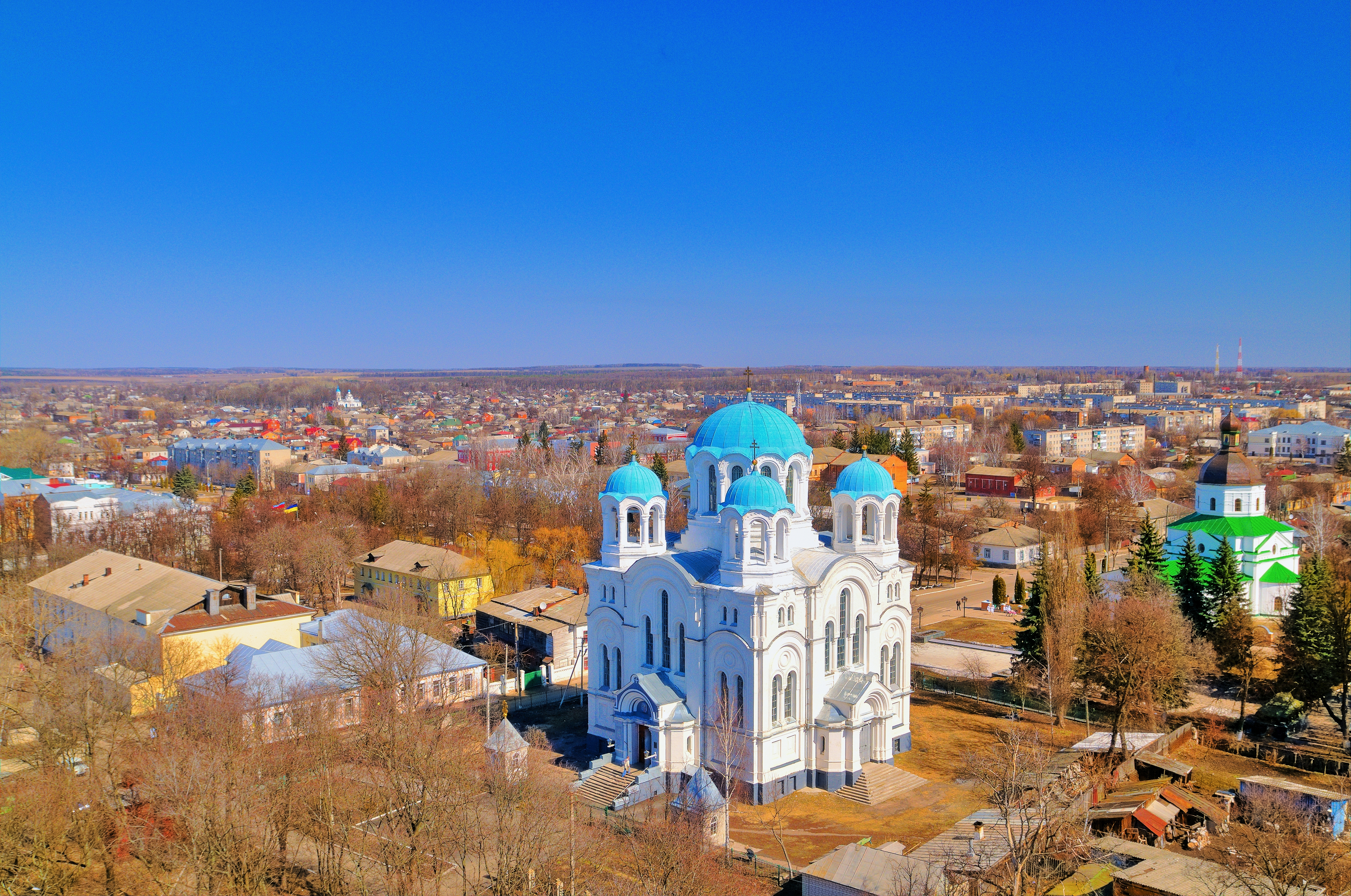
Hlukhiv

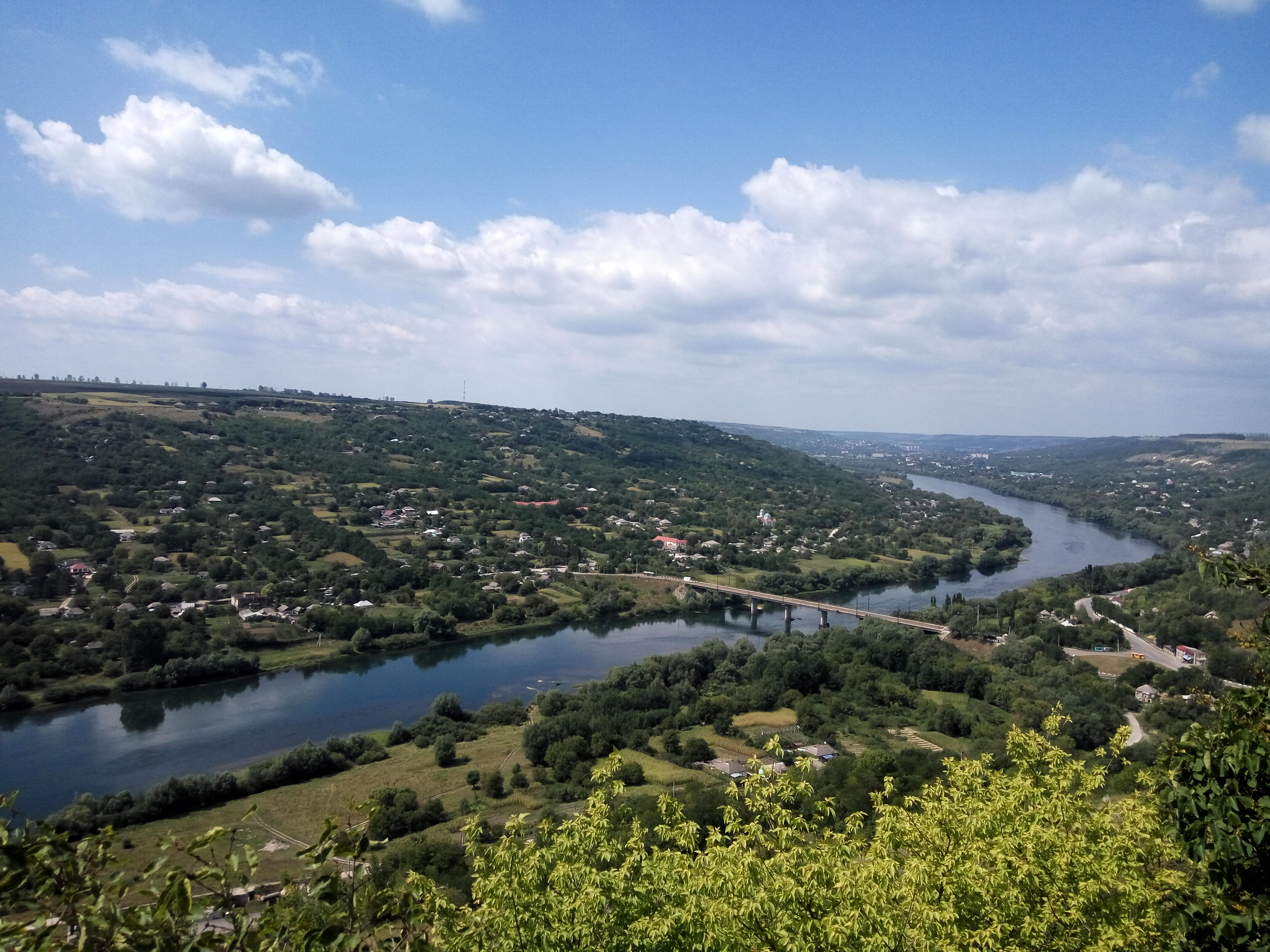
Mohyliv-Podilskyi

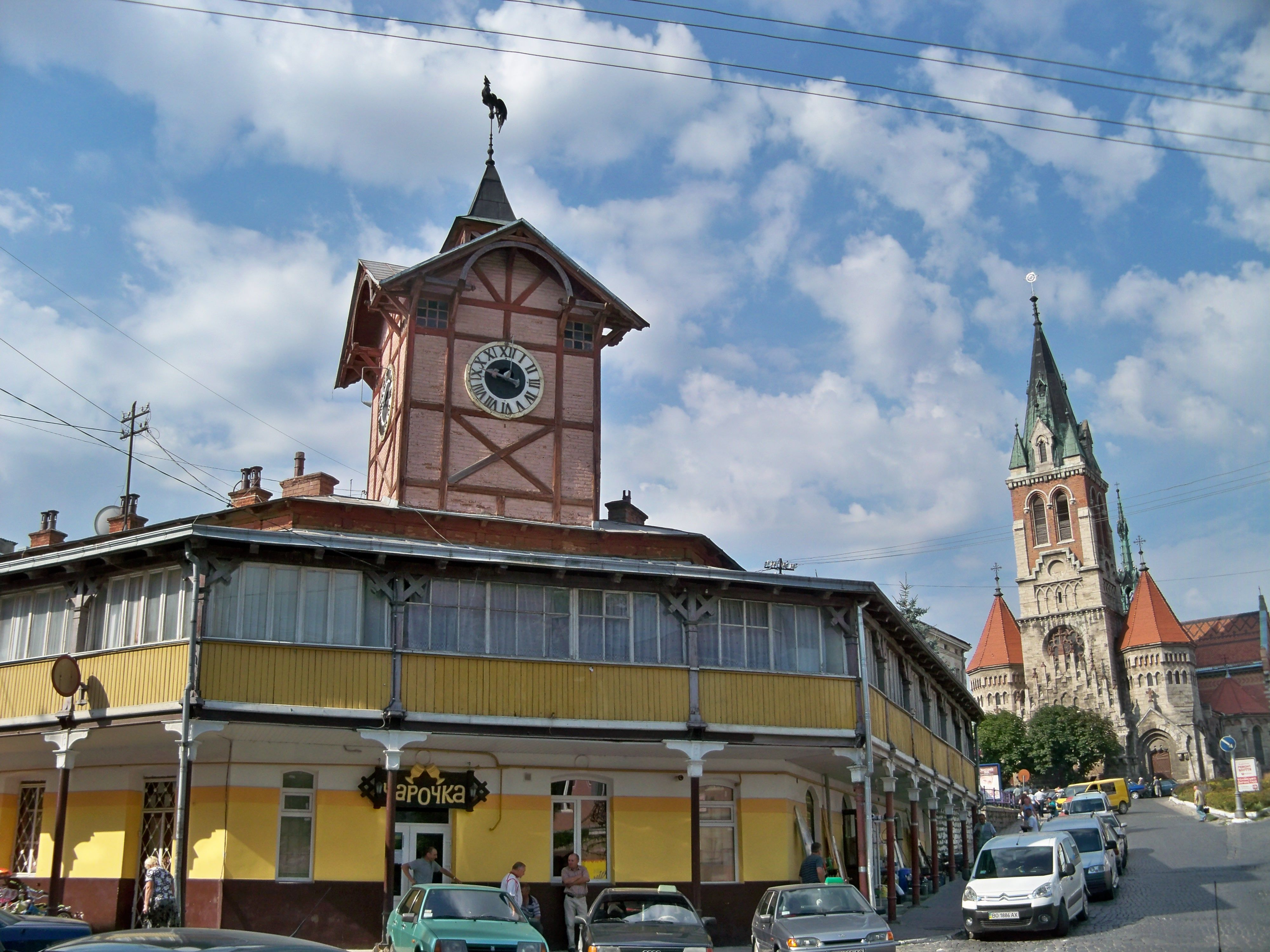
Chortkiv

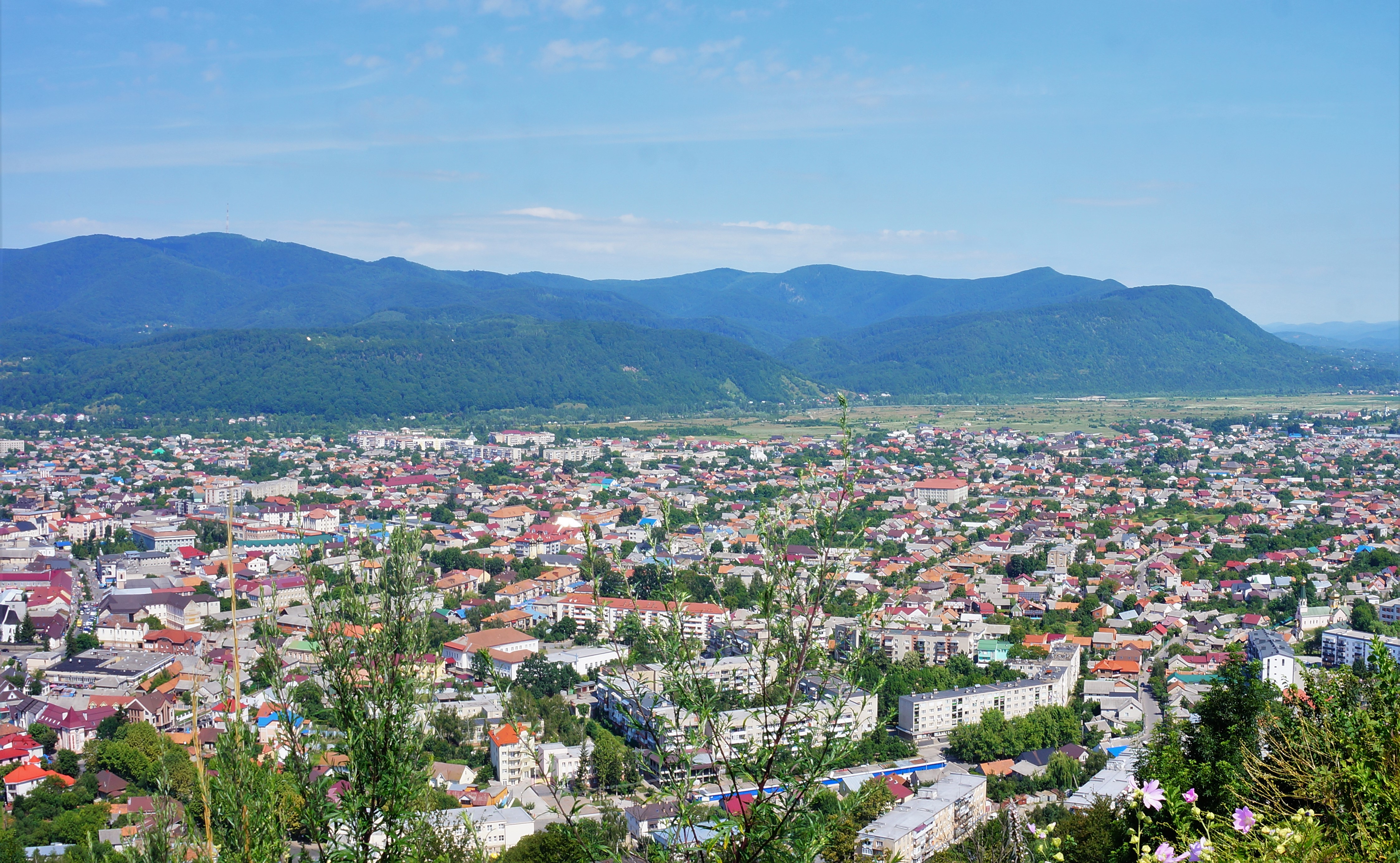
Khust

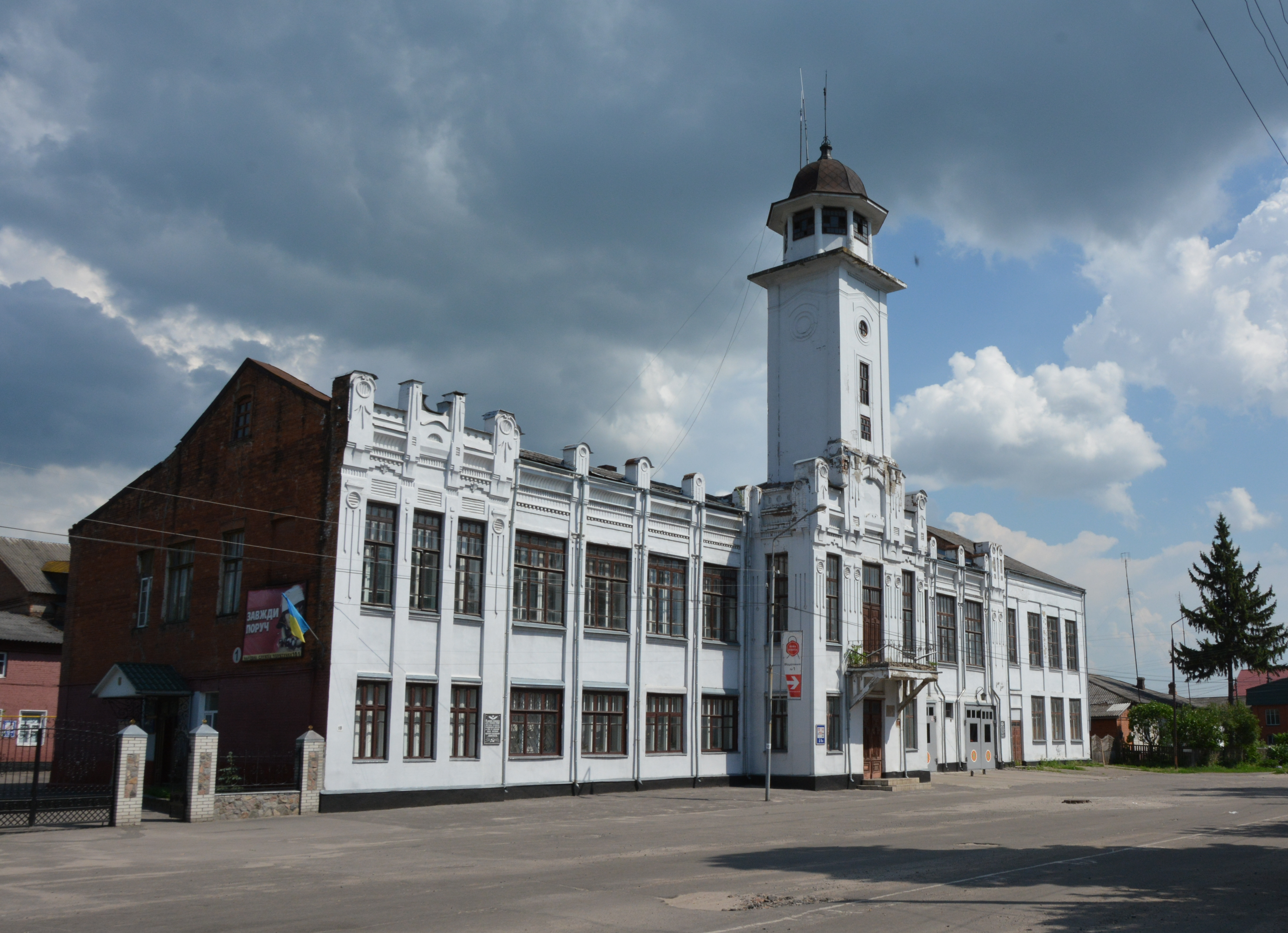
Lebedyn

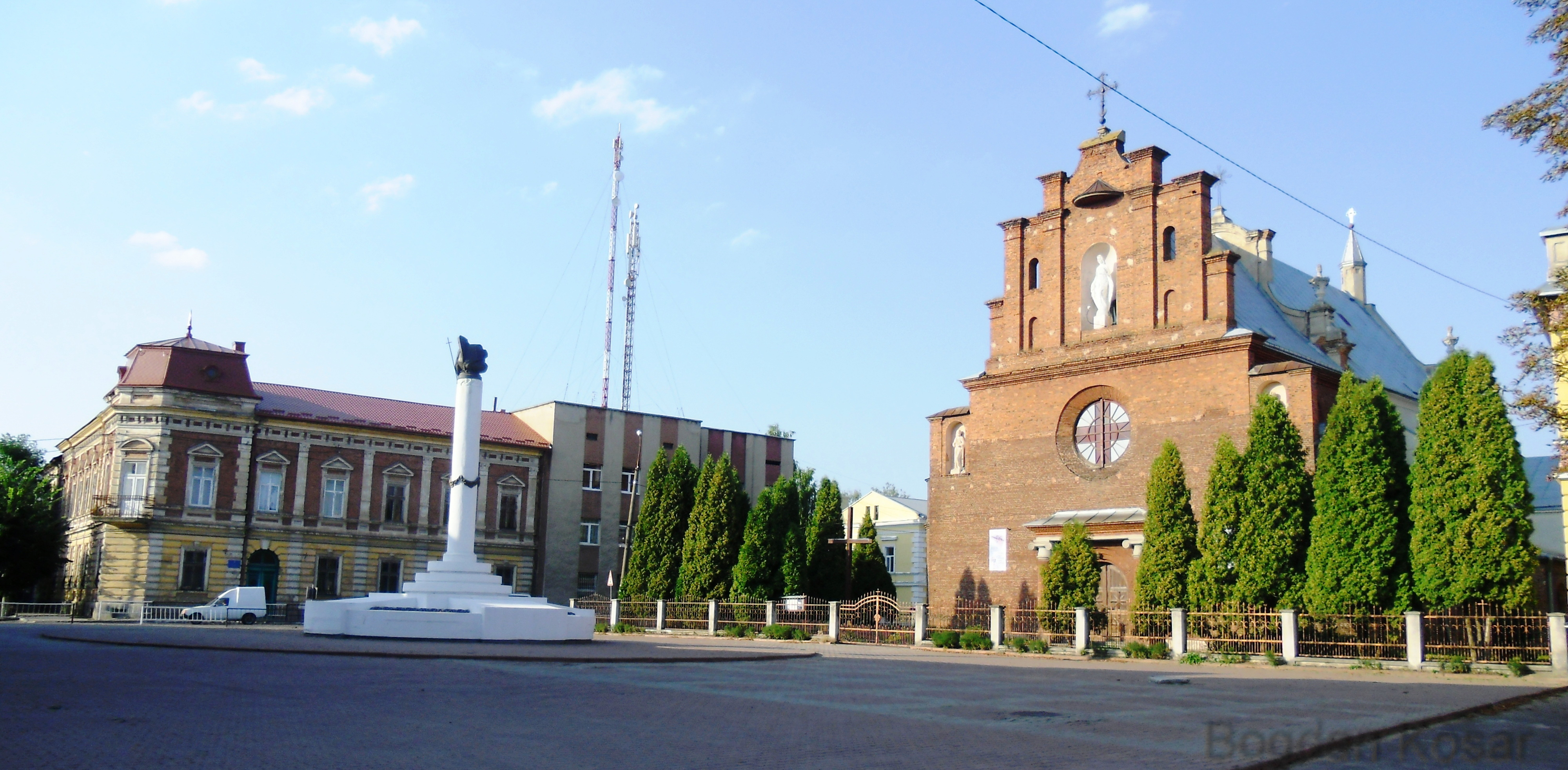
Horodok

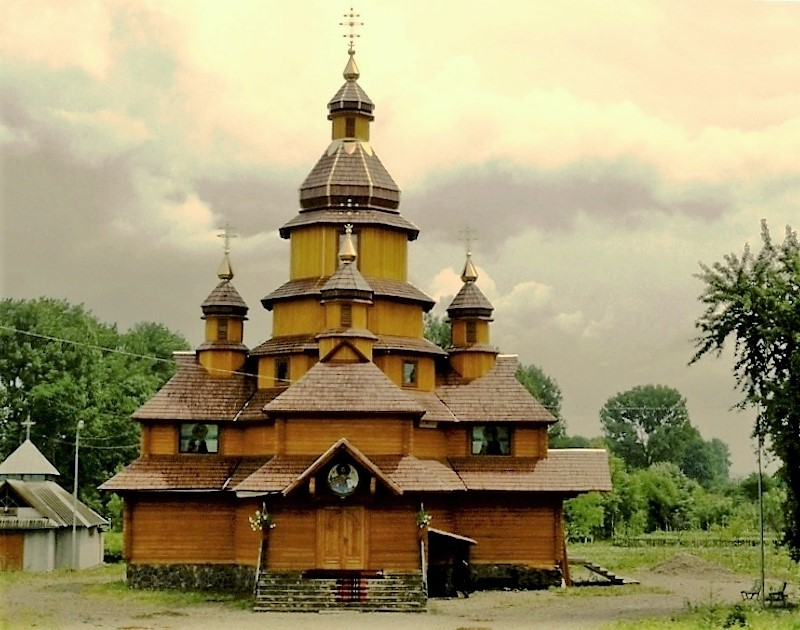
Zhydachiv

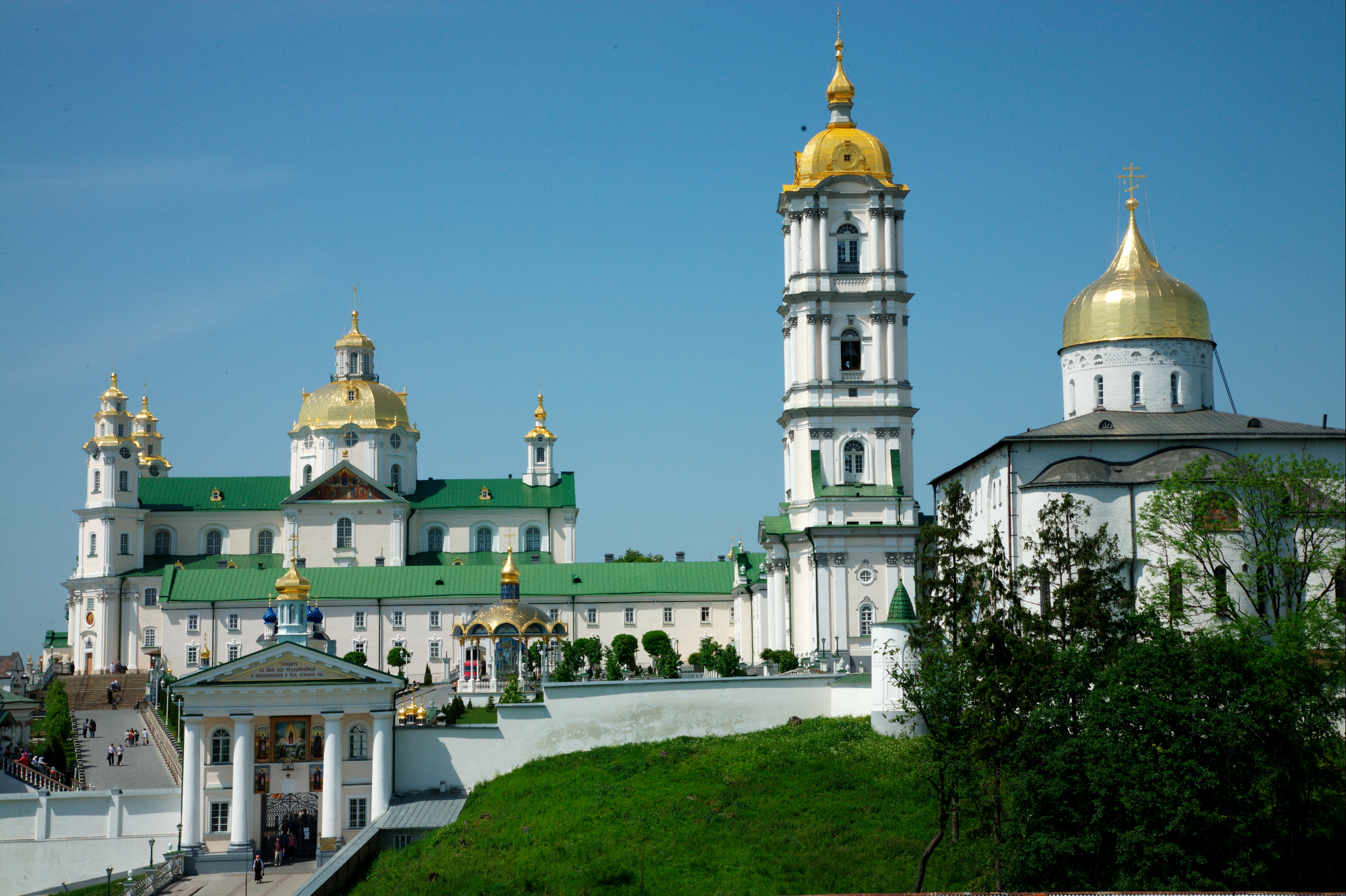
Pochaiv

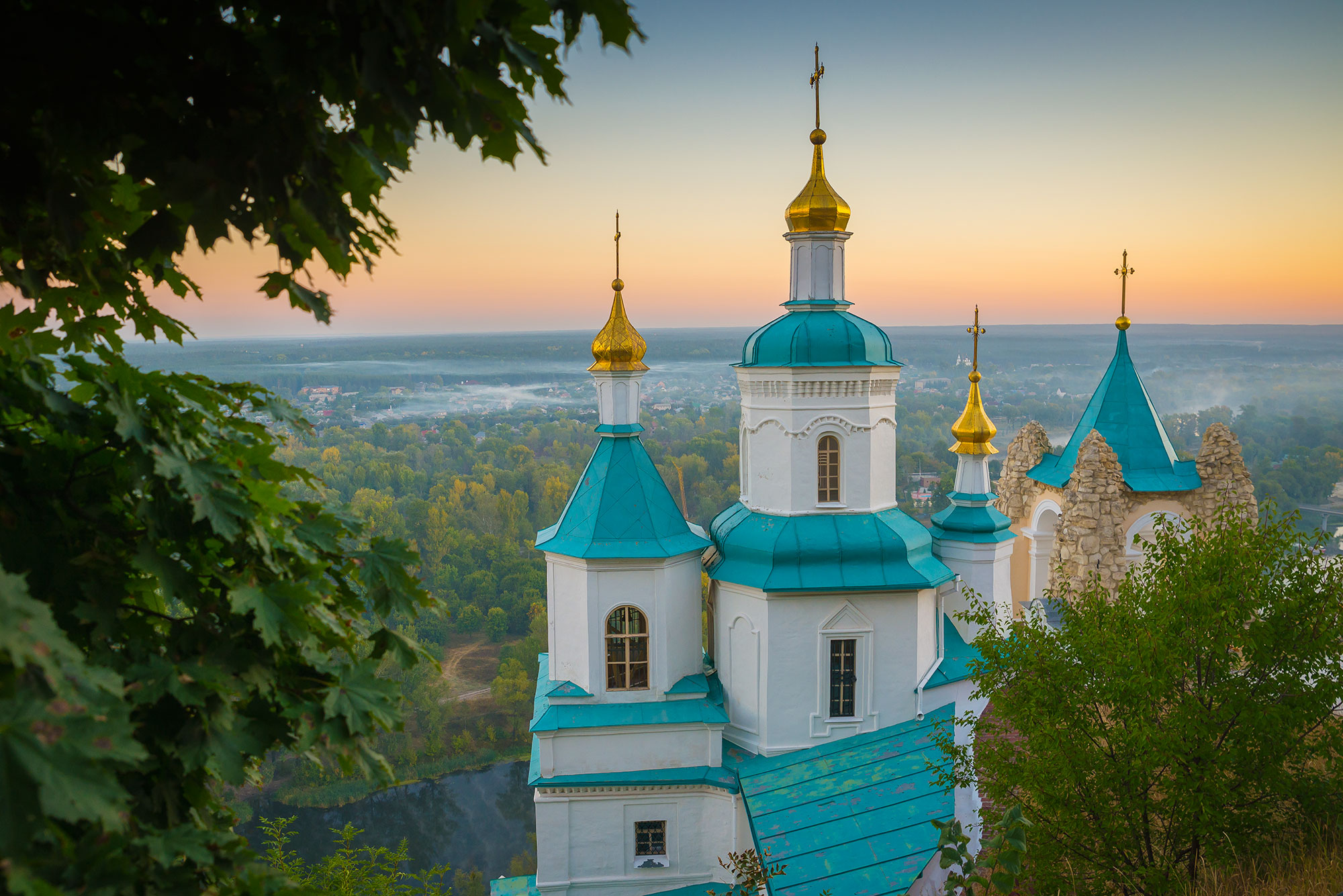
Sviatohirsk

Cities in Ukraine
Name	Name (on Ukrainian Wikipedia)	Administrative division	Population (2022 estimates)	Population (2001 census)	Population change
Alupka (Note: Controlled by Russia since the Russian occupation of Crimea.)	Алупка	Autonomous Republic of Crimea	7,771	9,018	−13.83%
Alushta	Алушта	Autonomous Republic of Crimea	29,078	31,440	−7.51%
Armiansk	Армянськ	Autonomous Republic of Crimea	21,987	23,869	−7.88%
Bakhchysarai	Бахчисарай	Autonomous Republic of Crimea	27,448	27,549	−0.37%
Bilohirsk	Білогірськ	Autonomous Republic of Crimea	16,354	18,790	−12.96%
Dzhankoi	Джанкой	Autonomous Republic of Crimea	38,622	43,343	−10.89%
Feodosia	Феодосія	Autonomous Republic of Crimea	69,038	74,669	−7.54%
Inkerman (Note: De jure part of the Autonomous Republic of Crimea since 2023 but de facto administered as a part of Sevastopol due to Russian occupation.)	Інкерман	Autonomous Republic of Crimea	10,348	10,628	−2.63%
Kerch	Керч	Autonomous Republic of Crimea	147,033	157,007	−6.35%
Saky	Саки	Autonomous Republic of Crimea	25,146	29,416	−14.52%
Shcholkine	Щолкіне	Autonomous Republic of Crimea	10,620	11,699	−9.22%
Simferopol	Сімферополь	Autonomous Republic of Crimea	332,317	343,644	−3.30%
Staryi Krym	Старий Крим	Autonomous Republic of Crimea	9,277	10,101	−8.16%
Sudak	Судак	Autonomous Republic of Crimea	16,492	14,495	+13.78%
Yalta	Ялта	Autonomous Republic of Crimea	76,746	81,654	−6.01%
Yany Kapu	Яни Капу	Autonomous Republic of Crimea	26,268	31,023	−15.33%
Yevpatoria	Євпаторія	Autonomous Republic of Crimea	105,719	105,915	−0.19%
Bahacheve	Багачеве	Cherkasy Oblast	15,763	20,156	−21.79%
Cherkasy	Черкаси	Cherkasy Oblast	269,836	295,414	−8.66%
Chyhyryn	Чигирин	Cherkasy Oblast	8,539	11,960	−28.60%
Horodyshche	Городище	Cherkasy Oblast	13,062	15,645	−16.51%
Kamianka	Кам'янка	Cherkasy Oblast	10,945	15,109	−27.56%
Kaniv	Канів	Cherkasy Oblast	23,172	26,657	−13.07%
Korsun-Shevchenkivskyi	Корсунь-Шевченківський	Cherkasy Oblast	17,216	19,311	−10.85%
Khrystynivka	Христинівка	Cherkasy Oblast	9,879	11,650	−15.20%
Monastyryshche	Монастирище	Cherkasy Oblast	8,338	9,463	−11.89%
Shpola	Шпола	Cherkasy Oblast	16,323	19,427	−15.98%
Smila	Сміла	Cherkasy Oblast	65,675	69,681	−5.75%
Talne	Тальне	Cherkasy Oblast	12,839	16,388	−21.66%
Uman	Умань	Cherkasy Oblast	81,525	88,735	−8.13%
Zhashkiv	Жашків	Cherkasy Oblast	13,242	15,853	−16.47%
Zvenyhorodka	Звенигородка	Cherkasy Oblast	16,269	19,901	−18.25%
Zolotonosha	Золотоноша	Cherkasy Oblast	27,206	28,793	−5.51%
Bakhmach	Бахмач	Chernihiv Oblast	16,862	23,417	−27.99%
Baturyn	Батурин	Chernihiv Oblast	2,406	3,078	−21.83%
Bobrovytsia	Бобровиця	Chernihiv Oblast	10,541	11,916	−11.54%
Borzna	Борзна	Chernihiv Oblast	9,454	11,707	−19.24%
Chernihiv	Чернігів	Chernihiv Oblast	282,747	304,994	−7.29%
Horodnia	Городня	Chernihiv Oblast	11,506	14,043	−18.07%
Ichnia	Ічня	Chernihiv Oblast	10,390	12,780	−18.70%
Koriukivka	Корюківка	Chernihiv Oblast	12,202	14,318	−14.78%
Mena	Мена	Chernihiv Oblast	10,935	12,940	−15.49%
Nizhyn	Ніжин	Chernihiv Oblast	65,830	76,625	−14.09%
Nosivka	Носівка	Chernihiv Oblast	12,908	15,966	−19.15%
Novhorod-Siverskyi	Новгород-Сіверський	Chernihiv Oblast	12,375	15,175	−18.45%
Oster	Остер	Chernihiv Oblast	5,564	7,194	−22.66%
Pryluky	Прилуки	Chernihiv Oblast	51,637	64,861	−20.39%
Semenivka	Семенівка	Chernihiv Oblast	7,792	9,656	−19.30%
Snovsk	Сновськ	Chernihiv Oblast	10,620	12,315	−13.76%
Chernivtsi	Чернівці	Chernivtsi Oblast	264,298	240,621	+9.84%
Hertsa	Герца	Chernivtsi Oblast	2,097	2,068	+1.40%
Kitsman	Кіцмань	Chernivtsi Oblast	6,049	7,608	−20.49%
Khotyn	Хотин	Chernivtsi Oblast	8,936	11,216	−20.33%
Novodnistrovsk	Новодністровськ	Chernivtsi Oblast	10,463	10,342	+1.17%
Novoselytsia	Новоселиця	Chernivtsi Oblast	7,399	8,400	−11.92%
Sokyriany	Сокиряни	Chernivtsi Oblast	8,547	10,258	−16.68%
Storozhynets	Сторожинець	Chernivtsi Oblast	14,077	14,693	−4.19%
Vashkivtsi	Вашківці	Chernivtsi Oblast	5,215	5,987	−12.89%
Vyzhnytsia	Вижниця	Chernivtsi Oblast	3,803	5,021	−24.26%
Zastavna	Заставна	Chernivtsi Oblast	7,750	8,866	−12.59%
Apostolove	Апостолове	Dnipropetrovsk Oblast	13,069	16,439	−20.50%
Dnipro	Дніпро	Dnipropetrovsk Oblast	968,502	1,080,846	−10.39%
Kamianske	Кам'янське	Dnipropetrovsk Oblast	226,845	255,841	−11.33%
Kryvyi Rih	Кривий Ріг	Dnipropetrovsk Oblast	603,904	709,014	−14.82%
Marhanets	Марганець	Dnipropetrovsk Oblast	44,980	49,592	−9.30%
Nikopol	Нікополь	Dnipropetrovsk Oblast	105,160	136,280	−22.84%
Pavlohrad	Павлоград	Dnipropetrovsk Oblast	101,430	118,816	−14.63%
Pereshchepyne	Перещепине	Dnipropetrovsk Oblast	9,639	10,041	−4.00%
Piatykhatky	П'ятихатки	Dnipropetrovsk Oblast	18,140	20,563	−11.78%
Pidhorodnie	Підгороднє	Dnipropetrovsk Oblast	19,138	17,763	+7.74%
Pokrov	Покров	Dnipropetrovsk Oblast	37,493	44,834	−16.37%
Samar	Самар	Dnipropetrovsk Oblast	69,855	72,439	−3.57%
Shakhtarske	Шахтарське	Dnipropetrovsk Oblast	27,099	29,140	−7.00%
Synelnykove	Синельникове	Dnipropetrovsk Oblast	29,651	32,302	−8.21%
Ternivka	Тернівка	Dnipropetrovsk Oblast	26,961	29,226	−7.75%
Verkhivtseve	Верхівцеве	Dnipropetrovsk Oblast	9,948	10,142	−1.91%
Verkhnodniprovsk	Верхньодніпровськ	Dnipropetrovsk Oblast	15,477	16,976	−8.83%
Vilnohirsk	Вільногірськ	Dnipropetrovsk Oblast	22,079	23,782	−7.16%
Zelenodolsk	Зеленодольськ	Dnipropetrovsk Oblast	12,692	14,792	−14.20%
Zhovti Vody	Жовті Води	Dnipropetrovsk Oblast	42,052	53,582	−21.52%
Amvrosiivka (Note: Controlled by the Donetsk People's Republic since the War in Donbas and by Russia since the Russian invasion of Ukraine.)	Амвросіївка	Donetsk Oblast	17,998	22,130	−18.67%
Avdiivka (Note: Controlled by Russia since the Russian invasion of Ukraine.)	Авдіївка	Donetsk Oblast	31,392	37,210	−15.64%
Bakhmut	Бахмут	Donetsk Oblast	71,094	82,916	−14.26%
Bilozerske	Білозерське	Donetsk Oblast	14,634	17,868	−18.10%
Bilytske	Білицьке	Donetsk Oblast	7,764	10,093	−23.08%
Bunhe	Бунге	Donetsk Oblast	13,495	17,813	−24.24%
Chasiv Yar	Часів Яр	Donetsk Oblast	12,250	16,612	−26.26%
Chystiakove	Чистякове	Donetsk Oblast	53,462	72,346	−26.10%
Debaltseve	Дебальцеве	Donetsk Oblast	24,209	30,246	−19.96%
Dobropillia	Добропілля	Donetsk Oblast	28,170	35,638	−20.96%
Dokuchaievsk	Докучаєвськ	Donetsk Oblast	22,835	24,383	−6.35%
Donetsk	Донецьк	Donetsk Oblast	901,645	1,016,194	−11.27%
Druzhkivka	Дружківка	Donetsk Oblast	53,977	64,557	−16.39%
Hirnyk	Гірник	Donetsk Oblast	10,357	14,207	−27.10%
Horlivka	Горлівка	Donetsk Oblast	239,828	292,250	−17.94%
Ilovaisk	Іловайськ	Donetsk Oblast	15,395	17,620	−12.63%
Khartsyzk	Харцизьк	Donetsk Oblast	56,182	64,175	−12.46%
Khrestivka	Хрестівка	Donetsk Oblast	27,370	30,910	−11.45%
Kalmiuske	Кальміуське	Donetsk Oblast	11,422	12,813	−10.86%
Kostiantynivka	Костянтинівка	Donetsk Oblast	67,350	95,111	−29.19%
Kramatorsk	Краматорськ	Donetsk Oblast	147,145	181,025	−18.72%
Krasnohorivka	Красногорівка	Donetsk Oblast	14,666	16,714	−12.25%
Kurakhove	Курахове	Donetsk Oblast	18,220	21,479	−15.17%
Lyman	Лиман	Donetsk Oblast	20,066	28,172	−28.77%
Makiivka	Макіївка	Donetsk Oblast	338,968	389,589	−12.99%
Marinka	Мар'їнка	Donetsk Oblast	9,089	10,722	−15.23%
Mariupol	Маріуполь	Donetsk Oblast	425,681	492,176	−13.51%
Mospyne	Моспине	Donetsk Oblast	10,471	11,736	−10.78%
Mykolaivka	Миколаївка	Donetsk Oblast	14,210	16,620 (Note: Classified as an urban-type settlement at the time of the 2001 census (granted city status on 18 November 2003).)	−14.50%
Myrnohrad	Мирноград	Donetsk Oblast	46,098	54,787	−15.86%
Novoazovsk	Новоазовськ	Donetsk Oblast	11,051	12,702	−13.00%
Novohrodivka	Новогродівка	Donetsk Oblast	14,037	17,473	−19.66%
Pokrovsk	Покровськ	Donetsk Oblast	60,127	69,154	−13.05%
Rodynske	Родинське	Donetsk Oblast	9,850	11,996	−17.89%
Selydove	Селидове	Donetsk Oblast	21,521	26,793	−19.68%
Shakhtarsk	Шахтарськ	Donetsk Oblast	48,208	59,589	−19.10%
Siversk	Сіверськ	Donetsk Oblast	10,875	14,393	−24.44%
Sloviansk	Слов'янськ	Donetsk Oblast	105,141	124,829	−15.77%
Snizhne	Сніжне	Donetsk Oblast	45,767	58,496	−21.76%
Soledar	Соледар	Donetsk Oblast	10,490	13,151	−20.23%
Sviatohirsk	Святогірськ	Donetsk Oblast	4,226	5,136	−17.72%
Svitlodarsk	Світлодарськ	Donetsk Oblast	11,127	13,184	−15.60%
Toretsk	Торецьк	Donetsk Oblast	30,914	43,371	−28.72%
Ukrainsk	Українськ	Donetsk Oblast	10,655	13,236	−19.50%
Volnovakha	Волноваха	Donetsk Oblast	21,166	24,647	−14.12%
Vuhledar	Вугледар	Donetsk Oblast	14,144	17,440	−18.90%
Vuhlehirsk	Вуглегірськ	Donetsk Oblast	7,294	10,309	−29.25%
Yasynuvata	Ясинувата	Donetsk Oblast	34,144	37,552	−9.08%
Yenakiieve	Єнакієве	Donetsk Oblast	76,673	103,997	−26.27%
Zalizne	Залізне	Donetsk Oblast	4,928	6,725	−26.72%
Zhdanivka	Жданівка	Donetsk Oblast	11,867	13,688	−13.30%
Zuhres	Зугрес	Donetsk Oblast	17,871	19,859	−10.01%
Bolekhiv	Болехів	Ivano-Frankivsk Oblast	10,259	10,633	−3.52%
Burshtyn	Бурштин	Ivano-Frankivsk Oblast	14,737	15,298	−3.67%
Dolyna	Долина	Ivano-Frankivsk Oblast	20,417	20,906	−2.34%
Halych	Галич	Ivano-Frankivsk Oblast	6,086	6,495	−6.30%
Horodenka	Городенка	Ivano-Frankivsk Oblast	8,812	9,794	−10.03%
Ivano-Frankivsk	Івано-Франківськ	Ivano-Frankivsk Oblast	238,196	218,359	+9.08%
Kalush	Калуш	Ivano-Frankivsk Oblast	65,088	67,902	−4.14%
Kolomyia	Коломия	Ivano-Frankivsk Oblast	60,821	61,989	−1.88%
Kosiv	Косів	Ivano-Frankivsk Oblast	8,351	8,301	+0.60%
Nadvirna	Надвірна	Ivano-Frankivsk Oblast	22,504	20,932	+7.51%
Rohatyn	Рогатин	Ivano-Frankivsk Oblast	7,521	8,607	−12.62%
Sniatyn	Снятин	Ivano-Frankivsk Oblast	9,718	10,479	−7.26%
Tlumach	Тлумач	Ivano-Frankivsk Oblast	8,689	8,831	−1.61%
Tysmenytsia	Тисмениця	Ivano-Frankivsk Oblast	8,958	9,790	−8.50%
Yaremche	Яремче	Ivano-Frankivsk Oblast	7,907	7,850	+0.73%
Balakliia	Балаклія	Kharkiv Oblast	26,334	32,408	−18.74%
Barvinkove	Барвінкове	Kharkiv Oblast	7,840	12,998	−39.68%
Berestyn	Берестин	Kharkiv Oblast	19,674	22,670	−13.22%
Bohodukhiv	Богодухів	Kharkiv Oblast	14,624	18,224	−19.75%
Chuhuiv	Чугуїв	Kharkiv Oblast	31,018	36,789	−15.69%
Derhachi	Дергачі	Kharkiv Oblast	17,139	20,258	−15.40%
Izium	Ізюм	Kharkiv Oblast	44,979	56,114	−19.84%
Kharkiv	Харків	Kharkiv Oblast	1,421,125	1,470,902	−3.38%
Kupiansk	Куп'янськ	Kharkiv Oblast	26,627	32,449	−17.94%
Liubotyn	Люботин	Kharkiv Oblast	20,001	24,173	−17.26%
Lozova	Лозова	Kharkiv Oblast	53,126	64,041	−17.04%
Merefa	Мерефа	Kharkiv Oblast	21,202	25,018	−15.25%
Pivdenne	Південне	Kharkiv Oblast	7,319	8,516	−14.06%
Slobozhanske	Слобожанське	Kharkiv Oblast	13,675	15,934	−14.18%
Valky	Валки	Kharkiv Oblast	8,577	10,381	−17.38%
Vovchansk	Вовчанськ	Kharkiv Oblast	17,459	20,695	−15.64%
Zlatopil	Златопіль	Kharkiv Oblast	28,510	32,523	−12.34%
Zmiiv	Зміїв	Kharkiv Oblast	13,737	17,063	−19.49%
Beryslav	Берислав	Kherson Oblast	11,895	15,455	−23.03%
Henichesk	Генічеськ	Kherson Oblast	18,889	21,793	−13.33%
Hola Prystan	Гола Пристань	Kherson Oblast	13,544	16,028	−15.50%
Kakhovka	Каховка	Kherson Oblast	34,749	38,238	−9.12%
Kherson	Херсон	Kherson Oblast	279,131	328,360	−14.99%
Nova Kakhovka	Нова Каховка	Kherson Oblast	44,427	52,611	−15.56%
Oleshky	Олешки	Kherson Oblast	24,124	24,123	0.00%
Skadovsk	Скадовськ	Kherson Oblast	16,969	19,641	−13.60%
Tavriisk	Таврійськ	Kherson Oblast	10,108	11,452	−11.74%
Derazhnia	Деражня	Khmelnytskyi Oblast	9,772	10,446	−6.45%
Dunaivtsi	Дунаївці	Khmelnytskyi Oblast	15,707	16,448	−4.51%
Horodok	Городок	Khmelnytskyi Oblast	15,633	17,746	−11.91%
Iziaslav	Ізяслав	Khmelnytskyi Oblast	15,996	18,444	−13.27%
Kamianets-Podilskyi	Кам'янець-Подільський	Khmelnytskyi Oblast	96,896	99,610	−2.72%
Khmelnytskyi	Хмельницький	Khmelnytskyi Oblast	274,452	253,994	+8.05%
Krasyliv	Красилів	Khmelnytskyi Oblast	18,356	20,580	−10.81%
Netishyn	Нетішин	Khmelnytskyi Oblast	36,492	34,358	+6.21%
Polonne	Полонне	Khmelnytskyi Oblast	20,172	23,211	−13.09%
Shepetivka	Шепетівка	Khmelnytskyi Oblast	40,299	48,212	−16.41%
Slavuta	Славута	Khmelnytskyi Oblast	34,918	34,340	+1.68%
Starokostiantyniv	Старокостянтинів	Khmelnytskyi Oblast	33,921	35,206	−3.65%
Volochysk	Волочиськ	Khmelnytskyi Oblast	18,295	20,958	−12.71%
Berezan	Березань	Kyiv Oblast	16,047	17,367	−7.60%
Bila Tserkva	Біла Церква	Kyiv Oblast	207,273	200,131	+3.57%
Bohuslav	Богуслав	Kyiv Oblast	15,789	17,135	−7.86%
Boryspil	Бориспіль	Kyiv Oblast	64,117	53,975	+18.79%
Boiarka	Боярка	Kyiv Oblast	34,394	35,968	−4.38%
Brovary	Бровари	Kyiv Oblast	109,806	86,839	+26.45%
Bucha	Буча	Kyiv Oblast	37,321	28,533	+30.80%
Chernobyl	Чорнобиль	Kyiv Oblast	1,054	0	NA
Fastiv	Фастів	Kyiv Oblast	44,014	51,976	−15.32%
Irpin	Ірпінь	Kyiv Oblast	65,167	40,593	+60.54%
Kaharlyk	Кагарлик	Kyiv Oblast	13,133	13,757	−4.54%
Myronivka	Миронівка	Kyiv Oblast	11,103	13,368	−16.94%
Obukhiv	Обухів	Kyiv Oblast	33,287	32,776	+1.56%
Pereiaslav	Переяслав	Kyiv Oblast	26,273	31,634	−16.95%
Pripyat	Прип'ять	Kyiv Oblast	0	0	NA
Rzhyshchiv	Ржищів	Kyiv Oblast	7,175	8,447	−15.06%
Skvyra	Сквира	Kyiv Oblast	15,165	18,126	−16.34%
Slavutych	Славутич	Kyiv Oblast	24,464	24,402	+0.25%
Tarashcha	Тараща	Kyiv Oblast	9,689	13,452	−27.97%
Tetiiv	Тетіїв	Kyiv Oblast	12,640	14,944	−15.42%
Ukrainka	Українка	Kyiv Oblast	16,081	14,163	+13.54%
Uzyn	Узин	Kyiv Oblast	11,921	13,217	−9.81%
Vasylkiv	Васильків	Kyiv Oblast	37,068	39,722	−6.68%
Vyshhorod	Вишгород	Kyiv Oblast	33,109	22,933	+44.37%
Vyshneve	Вишневе	Kyiv Oblast	42,983	34,465	+24.71%
Yahotyn	Яготин	Kyiv Oblast	18,995	23,659	−19.71%
Blahovishchenske	Благовіщенське	Kirovohrad Oblast	5,825	7,526	−22.60%
Bobrynets	Бобринець	Kirovohrad Oblast	10,396	12,300	−15.48%
Dolynska	Долинська	Kirovohrad Oblast	18,225	18,768	−2.89%
Haivoron	Гайворон	Kirovohrad Oblast	14,010	16,126	−13.12%
Kropyvnytskyi	Кропивницький	Kirovohrad Oblast	219,676	254,103	−13.55%
Mala Vyska	Мала Виска	Kirovohrad Oblast	9,960	13,132	−24.15%
Novomyrhorod	Новомиргород	Kirovohrad Oblast	10,715	13,220	−18.95%
Novoukrainka	Новоукраїнка	Kirovohrad Oblast	16,080	19,353	−16.91%
Oleksandriia	Олександрія	Kirovohrad Oblast	76,097	93,357	−18.49%
Pomichna	Помічна	Kirovohrad Oblast	8,608	10,946	−21.36%
Svitlovodsk	Світловодськ	Kirovohrad Oblast	43,130	50,094	−13.90%
Znamianka	Знам'янка	Kirovohrad Oblast	21,221	29,412	−27.85%
Alchevsk (Note: Controlled by the Luhansk People's Republic since the War in Donbas and by Russia since the Russian invasion of Ukraine.)	Алчевськ	Luhansk Oblast	106,062	119,193	−11.02%
Almazna	Алмазна	Luhansk Oblast	4,148	5,061	−18.04%
Antratsyt	Антрацит	Luhansk Oblast	52,150	63,698	−18.13%
Bokovo-Khrustalne	Боково-Хрустальне	Luhansk Oblast	11,421	14,773	−22.69%
Brianka	Брянка	Luhansk Oblast	44,760	54,767	−18.27%
Dovzhansk	Довжанськ	Luhansk Oblast	62,691	72,531	−13.57%
Hirske	Гірське	Luhansk Oblast	9,100	11,473	−20.68%
Holubivka	Голубівка	Luhansk Oblast	26,654	35,199	−24.28%
Irmino (Note: Known as Teplohirsk at the time of the 2001 census (renamed in 2010).)	Ірміно	Luhansk Oblast	9,270	13,053	−28.98%
Kadiivka	Кадіївка	Luhansk Oblast	73,248	90,152	−18.75%
Khrustalnyi	Хрустальний	Luhansk Oblast	79,533	94,875	−16.17%
Kreminna	Кремінна	Luhansk Oblast	18,116	24,447	−25.90%
Kypuche	Кипуче	Luhansk Oblast	7,162	9,097	−21.27%
Luhansk	Луганськ	Luhansk Oblast	397,677	463,097	−14.13%
Lutuhyne	Лутугине	Luhansk Oblast	17,061	18,833	−9.41%
Lysychansk	Лисичанськ	Luhansk Oblast	93,340	115,229	−19.00%
Miusynsk	Міусинськ	Luhansk Oblast	4,596	6,029	−23.77%
Novodruzhesk	Новодружеськ	Luhansk Oblast	6,705	9,025	−25.71%
Oleksandrivsk	Олександрівськ	Luhansk Oblast	6,401	7,045	−9.14%
Otamanivka	Отаманівка	Luhansk Oblast	22,449	25,528	−12.06%
Perevalsk	Перевальськ	Luhansk Oblast	24,817	29,665	−16.34%
Petrovo-Krasnosillia	Петрово-Красносілля	Luhansk Oblast	12,642	15,478	−18.32%
Popasna	Попасна	Luhansk Oblast	19,199	25,951	−26.02%
Pryvillia	Привілля	Luhansk Oblast	6,520	9,004	−27.59%
Rovenky	Ровеньки	Luhansk Oblast	45,514	53,725	−15.28%
Rubizhne	Рубіжне	Luhansk Oblast	55,247	65,322	−15.42%
Shchastia	Щастя	Luhansk Oblast	11,411	13,770	−17.13%
Siverskodonetsk	Сіверськодонецьк	Luhansk Oblast	99,067	119,940	−17.40%
Sokolohirsk	Сокологірськ	Luhansk Oblast	36,091	43,082	−16.23%
Sorokyne	Сорокине	Luhansk Oblast	42,315	50,560	−16.31%
Starobilsk	Старобільськ	Luhansk Oblast	15,947	22,371	−28.72%
Sukhodilsk	Суходільськ	Luhansk Oblast	20,390	23,642	−13.76%
Svatove	Сватове	Luhansk Oblast	16,145	19,495	−17.18%
Voznesenivka	Вознесенівка	Luhansk Oblast	15,218	17,680	−13.93%
Zolote	Золоте	Luhansk Oblast	13,007	17,836	−27.07%
Zorynsk	Зоринськ	Luhansk Oblast	7,096	8,838	−19.71%
Zymohiria	Зимогір'я	Luhansk Oblast	9,557	11,295	−15.39%
Belz	Белз	Lviv Oblast	2,191	2,478	−11.58%
Bibrka	Бібрка	Lviv Oblast	3,761	3,980	−5.50%
Boryslav	Борислав	Lviv Oblast	32,473	38,122	−14.82%
Brody	Броди	Lviv Oblast	23,134	23,239	−0.45%
Busk	Буськ	Lviv Oblast	8,662	8,673	−0.13%
Dobromyl	Добромиль	Lviv Oblast	4,111	4,976	−17.38%
Drohobych	Дрогобич	Lviv Oblast	73,682	79,119	−6.87%
Dubliany	Дубляни	Lviv Oblast	9,748	8,469	+15.10%
Hlyniany	Глиняни	Lviv Oblast	2,954	3,378	−12.55%
Horodok	Городок	Lviv Oblast	16,085	16,082	+0.02%
Kamianka-Buzka	Кам'янка-Бузька	Lviv Oblast	10,397	11,674	−10.94%
Khodoriv	Ходорів	Lviv Oblast	8,954	10,565	−15.25%
Khyriv	Хирів	Lviv Oblast	4,104	4,590	−10.59%
Komarno	Комарно	Lviv Oblast	3,653	3,994	−8.54%
Lviv	Львів	Lviv Oblast	717,273	732,818	−2.12%
Morshyn	Моршин	Lviv Oblast	5,562	6,482	−14.19%
Mostyska	Мостиська	Lviv Oblast	9,103	9,150	−0.51%
Mykolaiv	Миколаїв	Lviv Oblast	14,498	14,801	−2.05%
Novoiavorivsk	Новояворівськ	Lviv Oblast	31,366	26,483	+18.44%
Novyi Kalyniv	Новий Калинів	Lviv Oblast	4,243	3,582	+18.45%
Novyi Rozdil	Новий Розділ	Lviv Oblast	27,841	28,227	−1.37%
Peremyshliany	Перемишляни	Lviv Oblast	6,415	7,565	−15.20%
Pustomyty	Пустомити	Lviv Oblast	9,372	9,798	−4.35%
Radekhiv	Радехів	Lviv Oblast	9,680	9,230	+4.88%
Rava-Ruska	Рава-Руська	Lviv Oblast	8,494	8,070	+5.25%
Rudky	Рудки	Lviv Oblast	5,230	4,942	+5.83%
Sambir	Самбір	Lviv Oblast	34,152	36,556	−6.58%
Sheptytskyi	Шептицький	Lviv Oblast	64,297	70,568	−8.89%
Skole	Сколе	Lviv Oblast	6,054	6,742	−10.20%
Sokal	Сокаль	Lviv Oblast	20,373	21,693	−6.08%
Sosnivka	Соснівка	Lviv Oblast	10,712	11,889	−9.90%
Staryi Sambir	Старий Самбір	Lviv Oblast	6,440	5,706	+12.86%
Stebnyk	Стебник	Lviv Oblast	20,200	20,863	−3.18%
Stryi	Стрий	Lviv Oblast	59,425	62,479	−4.89%
Sudova Vyshnia	Судова Вишня	Lviv Oblast	6,470	6,668	−2.97%
Truskavets	Трускавець	Lviv Oblast	28,287	31,037	−8.86%
Turka	Турка	Lviv Oblast	6,925	7,681	−9.84%
Uhniv	Угнів	Lviv Oblast	939	974	−3.59%
Velyki Mosty	Великі Мости	Lviv Oblast	6,286	5,925	+6.09%
Vynnyky	Винники	Lviv Oblast	19,037	13,654	+39.42%
Yavoriv	Яворів	Lviv Oblast	12,785	13,510	−5.37%
Zhydachiv	Жидачів	Lviv Oblast	10,353	11,798	−12.25%
Zhovkva	Жовква	Lviv Oblast	13,852	13,474	+2.81%
Zolochiv	Золочів	Lviv Oblast	23,912	23,481	+1.84%
Bashtanka	Баштанка	Mykolaiv Oblast	12,180	13,146	−7.35%
Mykolaiv	Миколаїв	Mykolaiv Oblast	470,011	514,136	−8.58%
Nova Odesa	Нова Одеса	Mykolaiv Oblast	11,510	14,070	−18.19%
Novyi Buh	Новий Буг	Mykolaiv Oblast	14,782	16,250	−9.03%
Ochakiv	Очаків	Mykolaiv Oblast	13,663	16,929	−19.29%
Pervomaisk	Первомайськ	Mykolaiv Oblast	62,426	70,170	−11.04%
Pivdennoukrainsk	Південноукраїнськ	Mykolaiv Oblast	38,560	38,206	+0.93%
Snihurivka	Снігурівка	Mykolaiv Oblast	12,045	15,447	−22.02%
Voznesensk	Вознесенськ	Mykolaiv Oblast	33,442	42,634	−21.56%
Kyiv	Київ	N/A (city with special status)	2,952,301	2,611,327	+13.06%
Sevastopol	Севастополь	N/A (city with special status)	393,304 (Note: Includes population figures for Balaklava and excludes population of Inkerman city.)	342,451	+14.85%
Ananiv	Ананьїв	Odesa Oblast	7,626	9,476	−19.52%
Artsyz	Арциз	Odesa Oblast	14,355	16,370	−12.31%
Balta	Балта	Odesa Oblast	17,854	19,962	−10.56%
Berezivka	Березівка	Odesa Oblast	9,428	9,481	−0.56%
Biliaivka	Біляївка	Odesa Oblast	12,355	14,294	−13.57%
Bilhorod-Dnistrovskyi	Білгород-Дністровський	Odesa Oblast	47,727	51,890	−8.02%
Bolhrad	Болград	Odesa Oblast	14,818	17,353	−14.61%
Chornomorsk	Чорноморськ	Odesa Oblast	57,983	54,151	+7.08%
Izmail	Ізмаїл	Odesa Oblast	69,932	84,815	−17.55%
Kiliia	Кілія	Odesa Oblast	18,745	22,594	−17.04%
Kodyma	Кодима	Odesa Oblast	8,404	9,634	−12.77%
Odesa	Одеса	Odesa Oblast	1,010,537	1,029,049	−1.80%
Pivdenne	Південне	Odesa Oblast	32,677	23,977	+36.28%
Podilsk	Подільськ	Odesa Oblast	39,220	40,718	−3.68%
Reni	Рені	Odesa Oblast	17,736	20,481	−13.40%
Rozdilna	Роздільна	Odesa Oblast	17,441	17,754	−1.76%
Tatarbunary	Татарбунари	Odesa Oblast	10,836	10,797	+0.36%
Teplodar	Теплодар	Odesa Oblast	9,958	8,830	+12.77%
Vylkove	Вилкове	Odesa Oblast	7,712	9,260	−16.72%
Hadiach	Гадяч	Poltava Oblast	22,851	22,698	+0.67%
Hlobyne	Глобине	Poltava Oblast	8,955	12,902	−30.59%
Horishni Plavni	Горішні Плавні	Poltava Oblast	49,854	51,740	−3.65%
Hrebinka	Гребінка	Poltava Oblast	10,541	11,662	−9.61%
Karlivka	Карлівка	Poltava Oblast	14,045	17,995	−21.95%
Khorol	Хорол	Poltava Oblast	12,540	14,753	−15.00%
Kobeliaky	Кобеляки	Poltava Oblast	9,465	12,076	−21.62%
Kremenchuk	Кременчук	Poltava Oblast	215,271	234,073	−8.03%
Lokhvytsia	Лохвиця	Poltava Oblast	11,014	12,389	−11.10%
Lubny	Лубни	Poltava Oblast	44,089	52,572	−16.14%
Myrhorod	Миргород	Poltava Oblast	37,886	42,886	−11.66%
Poltava	Полтава	Poltava Oblast	279,593	317,998	−12.08%
Pyriatyn	Пирятин	Poltava Oblast	14,988	16,664	−10.06%
Reshetylivka	Решетилівка	Poltava Oblast	9,021	9,457	−4.61%
Zavodske	Заводське	Poltava Oblast	7,712	9,024	−14.54%
Zinkiv	Зіньків	Poltava Oblast	9,168	10,577	−13.32%
Berezne	Березне	Rivne Oblast	13,126	13,669	−3.97%
Dubno	Дубно	Rivne Oblast	36,901	39,146	−5.73%
Dubrovytsia	Дубровиця	Rivne Oblast	9,343	9,644	−3.12%
Korets	Корець	Rivne Oblast	6,914	8,649	−20.06%
Kostopil	Костопіль	Rivne Oblast	30,838	30,467	+1.22%
Ostroh	Острог	Rivne Oblast	14,894	14,801	+0.63%
Radyvyliv	Радивилів	Rivne Oblast	10,427	10,311	+1.13%
Rivne	Рівне	Rivne Oblast	243,873	248,813	−1.99%
Sarny	Сарни	Rivne Oblast	28,626	28,144	+1.71%
Varash	Вараш	Rivne Oblast	41,711	38,830	+7.42%
Zdolbuniv	Здолбунів	Rivne Oblast	24,501	24,612	−0.45%
Bilopillia	Білопілля	Sumy Oblast	15,600	18,384	−15.14%
Buryn	Буринь	Sumy Oblast	8,197	11,678	−29.81%
Hlukhiv	Глухів	Sumy Oblast	31,789	35,768	−11.12%
Khutir-Mykhailivskyi	Хутір-Михайлівський	Sumy Oblast	4,504	5,726	−21.34%
Konotop	Конотоп	Sumy Oblast	83,543	92,657	−9.84%
Krolevets	Кролевець	Sumy Oblast	22,111	25,183	−12.20%
Lebedyn	Лебедин	Sumy Oblast	23,892	28,948	−17.47%
Okhtyrka	Охтирка	Sumy Oblast	46,660	50,399	−7.42%
Putyvl	Путивль	Sumy Oblast	14,886	17,354	−14.22%
Romny	Ромни	Sumy Oblast	37,765	50,448	−25.14%
Seredyna-Buda	Середина-Буда	Sumy Oblast	6,888	7,511	−8.29%
Shostka	Шостка	Sumy Oblast	71,966	87,130	−17.40%
Sumy	Суми	Sumy Oblast	256,474	293,141	−12.51%
Trostianets	Тростянець	Sumy Oblast	19,544	23,308	−16.15%
Vorozhba	Ворожба	Sumy Oblast	6,674	8,384	−20.40%
Berezhany	Бережани	Ternopil Oblast	17,139	17,617	−2.71%
Borshchiv	Борщів	Ternopil Oblast	10,632	11,382	−6.59%
Buchach	Бучач	Ternopil Oblast	12,171	12,549	−3.01%
Chortkiv	Чортків	Ternopil Oblast	28,279	29,057	−2.68%
Khorostkiv	Хоростків	Ternopil Oblast	6,652	7,306	−8.95%
Kopychyntsi	Копичинці	Ternopil Oblast	6,502	7,036	−7.59%
Kremenets	Кременець	Ternopil Oblast	20,476	22,051	−7.14%
Lanivtsi	Ланівці	Ternopil Oblast	8,215	8,680	−5.36%
Monastyryska	Монастириська	Ternopil Oblast	5,380	6,344	−15.20%
Pidhaitsi	Підгайці	Ternopil Oblast	2,609	3,280	−20.46%
Pochaiv	Почаїв	Ternopil Oblast	7,633	8,240	−7.37%
Shumsk	Шумськ	Ternopil Oblast	5,300	5,161	+2.69%
Skalat	Скалат	Ternopil Oblast	3,739	4,036	−7.36%
Terebovlia	Теребовля	Ternopil Oblast	13,226	13,661	−3.18%
Ternopil	Тернопіль	Ternopil Oblast	225,004	227,755	−1.21%
Zalishchyky	Заліщики	Ternopil Oblast	8,928	10,125	−11.82%
Zbarazh	Збараж	Ternopil Oblast	13,346	13,228	+0.89%
Zboriv	Зборів	Ternopil Oblast	6,621	7,436	−10.96%
Bar	Бар	Vinnytsia Oblast	15,337	17,284	−11.26%
Bershad	Бершадь	Vinnytsia Oblast	12,205	13,336	−8.48%
Haisyn	Гайсин	Vinnytsia Oblast	25,698	25,640	+0.23%
Hnivan	Гнівань	Vinnytsia Oblast	12,191	12,832	−5.00%
Illintsi	Іллінці	Vinnytsia Oblast	11,095	11,340	−2.16%
Kalynivka	Калинівка	Vinnytsia Oblast	18,492	20,061	−7.82%
Khmilnyk	Хмільник	Vinnytsia Oblast	26,916	27,898	−3.52%
Koziatyn	Козятин	Vinnytsia Oblast	22,241	26,635	−16.50%
Ladyzhyn	Ладижин	Vinnytsia Oblast	22,459	22,219	+1.08%
Lypovets	Липовець	Vinnytsia Oblast	7,958	9,406	−15.39%
Mohyliv-Podilskyi	Могилів-Подільський	Vinnytsia Oblast	29,925	32,853	−8.91%
Nemyriv	Немирів	Vinnytsia Oblast	11,421	12,082	−5.47%
Pohrebyshche	Погребище	Vinnytsia Oblast	9,209	10,754	−14.37%
Sharhorod	Шаргород	Vinnytsia Oblast	6,982	7,161	−2.50%
Tulchyn	Тульчин	Vinnytsia Oblast	14,446	16,136	−10.47%
Vinnytsia	Вінниця	Vinnytsia Oblast	369,739	356,665	+3.67%
Yampil	Ямпіль	Vinnytsia Oblast	10,679	11,787	−9.40%
Zhmerynka	Жмеринка	Vinnytsia Oblast	33,754	37,349	−9.63%
Berestechko	Берестечко	Volyn Oblast	1,630	1,904	−14.39%
Horokhiv	Горохів	Volyn Oblast	8,925	9,015	−1.00%
Kamin-Kashyrskyi	Камінь-Каширський	Volyn Oblast	12,477	10,818	+15.34%
Kivertsi	Ківерці	Volyn Oblast	13,798	16,678	−17.27%
Kovel	Ковель	Volyn Oblast	67,575	66,401	+1.77%
Liuboml	Любомль	Volyn Oblast	10,295	10,395	−0.96%
Lutsk	Луцьк	Volyn Oblast	215,986	208,816	+3.43%
Novovolynsk	Нововолинськ	Volyn Oblast	49,772	53,838	−7.55%
Olyka	Олика	Volyn Oblast	3,032	2,865	+5.83%
Rozhyshche	Рожище	Volyn Oblast	12,483	13,636	−8.46%
Ustyluh	Устилуг	Volyn Oblast	2,060	2,283	−9.77%
Volodymyr	Володимир	Volyn Oblast	37,910	38,256	−0.90%
Berehove	Берегове	Zakarpattia Oblast	23,325	26,735	−12.75%
Chop	Чоп	Zakarpattia Oblast	8,626	8,919	−3.29%
Irshava	Іршава	Zakarpattia Oblast	9,163	9,515	−3.70%
Khust	Хуст	Zakarpattia Oblast	28,039	29,080	−3.58%
Mukachevo	Мукачево	Zakarpattia Oblast	85,569	82,346	+3.91%
Perechyn	Перечин	Zakarpattia Oblast	6,477	7,083	−8.56%
Rakhiv	Рахів	Zakarpattia Oblast	15,536	15,241	+1.94%
Svaliava	Свалява	Zakarpattia Oblast	17,068	17,145	−0.45%
Tiachiv	Тячів	Zakarpattia Oblast	8,887	9,786	−9.19%
Uzhhorod	Ужгород	Zakarpattia Oblast	115,449	117,317	−1.59%
Vynohradiv	Виноградів	Zakarpattia Oblast	25,317	25,760	−1.72%
Berdiansk	Бердянськ	Zaporizhzhia Oblast	106,311	121,692	−12.64%
Dniprorudne	Дніпрорудне	Zaporizhzhia Oblast	17,736	21,054	−15.76%
Enerhodar	Енергодар	Zaporizhzhia Oblast	52,237	56,242	−7.12%
Huliaipole	Гуляйполе	Zaporizhzhia Oblast	12,786	17,077	−25.13%
Kamianka-Dniprovska	Кам'янка-Дніпровська	Zaporizhzhia Oblast	12,117	15,522	−21.94%
Melitopol	Мелітополь	Zaporizhzhia Oblast	148,851	160,657	−7.35%
Molochansk	Молочанськ	Zaporizhzhia Oblast	6,099	7,964	−23.42%
Orikhiv	Оріхів	Zaporizhzhia Oblast	13,896	17,955	−22.61%
Polohy	Пологи	Zaporizhzhia Oblast	18,111	22,206	−18.44%
Prymorsk	Приморськ	Zaporizhzhia Oblast	11,157	12,973	−14.00%
Tokmak	Токмак	Zaporizhzhia Oblast	29,573	36,275	−18.48%
Vasylivka	Василівка	Zaporizhzhia Oblast	12,567	15,592	−19.40%
Vilniansk	Вільнянськ	Zaporizhzhia Oblast	14,324	16,522	−13.30%
Zaporizhzhia	Запоріжжя	Zaporizhzhia Oblast	710,052	817,882	−13.18%
Andrushivka	Андрушівка	Zhytomyr Oblast	8,325	9,890	−15.82%
Baranivka	Баранівка	Zhytomyr Oblast	11,161	12,584	−11.31%
Berdychiv	Бердичів	Zhytomyr Oblast	73,046	87,575	−16.59%
Chudniv	Чуднів	Zhytomyr Oblast	5,357	6,558	−18.31%
Korosten	Коростень	Zhytomyr Oblast	61,496	66,669	−7.76%
Korostyshiv	Коростишів	Zhytomyr Oblast	24,129	26,068	−7.44%
Malyn	Малин	Zhytomyr Oblast	25,172	28,113	−10.46%
Olevsk	Олевськ	Zhytomyr Oblast	10,032	10,896	−7.93%
Ovruch	Овруч	Zhytomyr Oblast	15,250	17,031	−10.46%
Radomyshl	Радомишль	Zhytomyr Oblast	13,685	15,326	−10.71%
Zhytomyr	Житомир	Zhytomyr Oblast	261,624	284,236	−7.96%
Zviahel	Звягель	Zhytomyr Oblast	55,086	56,259	−2.08%

== See also ==
- Geography of Ukraine
- ISO 3166-2:UA
- List of places named after people (Ukraine)
