= Yanukovych (surname) =

Family name

- Language: Ukrainian

Origin
- Meaning: "son of Yanuk"
- Region of origin: Belarus

Yanukovych (Ukrainian: Янукович) is a Ukrainian-language spelling of the Belarusian surname Yanukovich (Belarusian: Януковіч), a patronymic surname derived from the given name Yanuk, a diminutive of Yan, Polish: Jan, i.e., Ivan. The Polish-language spelling is Janukowicz. Notable people with the surname include:

- Viktor Yanukovych (born 1950), Ukrainian politician of Belarusian, Polish and Russian descent who served as 4th President of Ukraine from 2010 until his overthrow in the 2014 Ukrainian Revolution
  - Lyudmyla Yanukovych (born 1949), ex-wife of Viktor Yanukovych, former First Lady of Ukraine
  - Oleksandr Yanukovych (born 1973), Ukrainian businessman
  - Viktor Yanukovych Jr. (1981–2015), Ukrainian politician
- Zofia Janukowicz-Pobłocka (1928–2019), Polish opera singer, soprano
