= Lyudmyla Yanukovych =

First Lady of Ukraine from 2010 to 2014

- Людмила Янукович
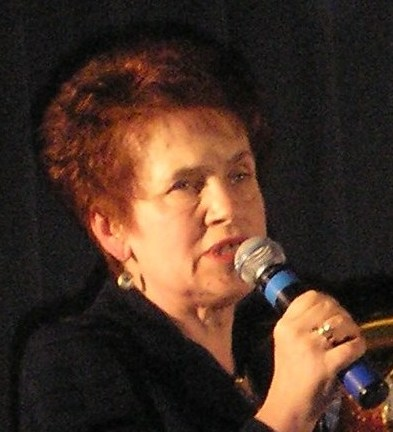
- Yanukovych in 2013

First Lady of Ukraine
- In role 25 February 2010 – 22 February 2014
- President: Viktor Yanukovych
- Preceded by: Kateryna Yushchenko
- Succeeded by: Hanna Turchynova (Acting)

Spouse of the Prime Minister of Ukraine
- In role 4 August 2006 – 18 December 2007
- Prime Minister: Viktor Yanukovych
- Preceded by: Olena Yekhanurova
- Succeeded by: Oleksandr Tymoshenko
- In role 21 November 2002 – 5 January 2005
- Prime Minister: Viktor Yanukovych
- Preceded by: Maryna Volodymyrivna
- Succeeded by: Lyudmyla Azarova (acting)

Personal details
- Born: Lyudmyla Oleksandrivna Nastenko; 9 October 1949 (age 76) Yenakiieve, Donetsk Oblast, Ukraine SSR, Soviet Union
- Spouse: Viktor Yanukovych (m. 1971; div. 2016)
- Children: Oleksandr; Viktor
- Education: Donbas National Academy of Civil Engineering and Architecture

Lyudmyla Oleksandrivna Yanukovych (Note: Ukrainian: Людмила Олександрівна Янукович; Russian: Людмила Александровна Янукович, romanized: Lyudmila Aleksandrovna Yanukovich) (née Nastenko; (Note: Настенко) born 9 October 1949) is a Ukrainian former engineer who served as First Lady of Ukraine from 2010 to 2014, as the wife of President Viktor Yanukovych.

== Early life and education ==
Lyudmyla Oleksandrivna Nastenko was born on 9 October 1949 in Yenakiieve, Donetsk Oblast, Ukraine SSR. She graduated from the Donbas National Academy of Civil Engineering and Architecture.

== Career ==
=== Engineering career ===
Yanukovych worked at the Yenakiieve Iron and Steel Works in the design and appraisal bureau and was a specialist at the Enakievmetalurgbud Trust.

=== First Lady of Ukraine (2010–2014) ===
Yanukovych served as First Lady of Ukraine from 2010 to 2014 during the presidency of her then-husband, Viktor Yanukovych. According to Ukrainska Pravda, during this period she lived separately in Donetsk. Following the outbreak of the war in Donbas, she reportedly relocated to Crimea.

=== Post-marriage life ===
According to an investigation published by the Ukrainian YouTube channel "Toronto TV" in July 2026, Yanukovych's phone number has been listed as belonging to a dead person since June 2026. However, no death confirmation was found.

== Personal life ==
In 1971, Lyudmyla Nastenko married Viktor Yanukovych. In February 2017, Viktor Yanukovych stated that they had divorced after 45 years of marriage. They had two sons, Oleksandr and Viktor; the younger Viktor served as a member of the Parliament of Ukraine from 2006 to 2014 and died in 2015.

== Notes ==
Honorary titles
Preceded by Kateryna Yushchenko	First Lady of Ukraine; 2010–2014	Succeeded by Hanna Turchynova; Acting
