= Yenakiieve =

City in Donetsk Oblast of Ukraine

Yenakiieve Єнакієве
- City
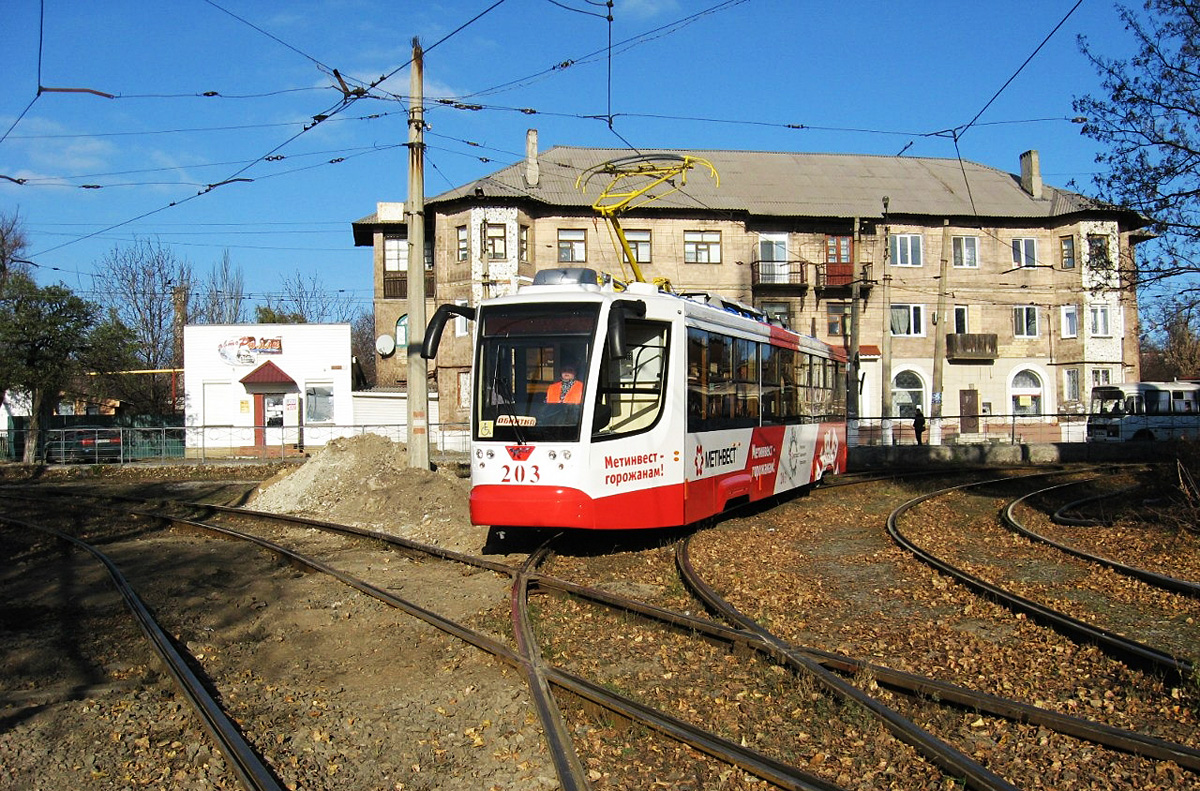
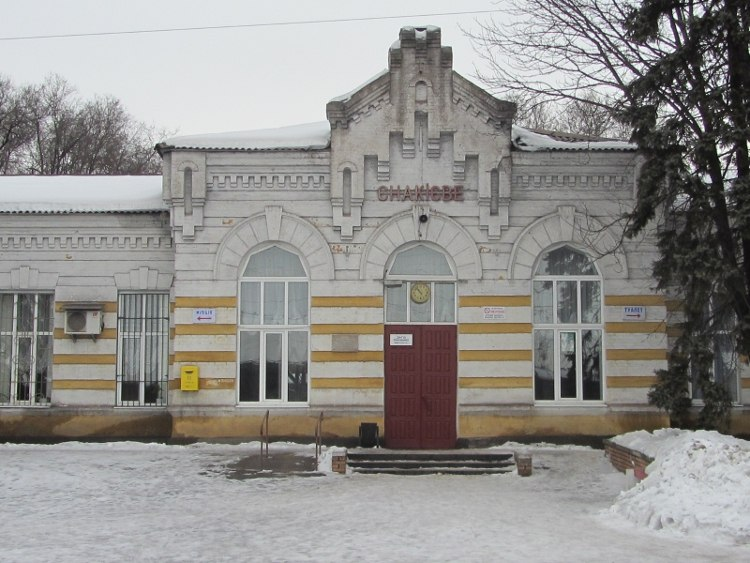
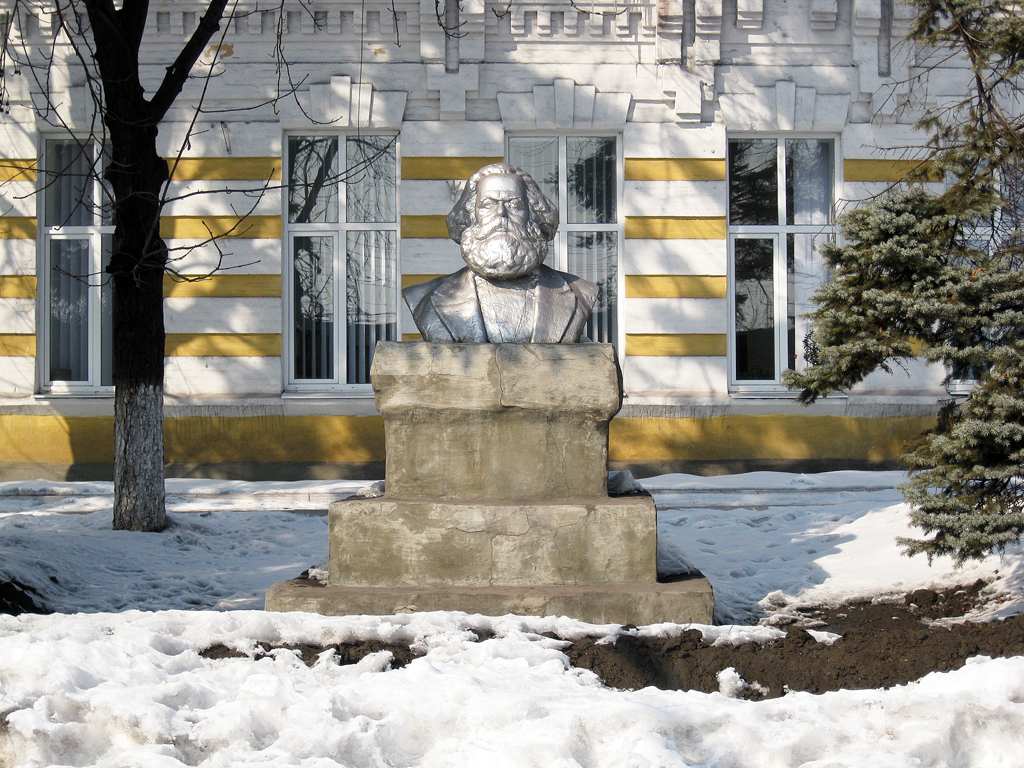
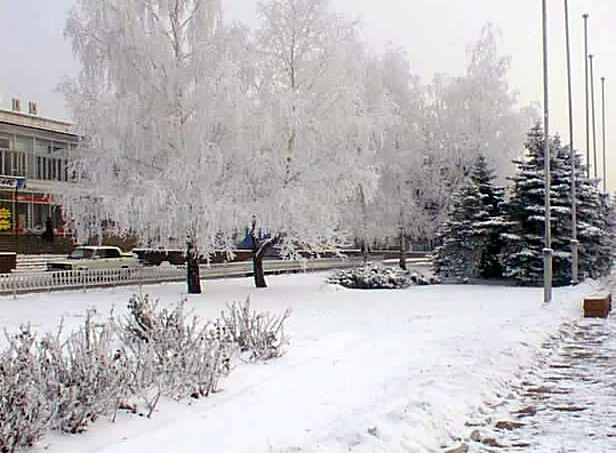

- Flag Coat of arms
- Interactive map of Yenakiieve
- Map of Donetsk Oblast with Yenakiieve highlighted. Yenakiieve (Ukraine)
- Coordinates: 48°13′00″N 38°12′00″E
- Country: Ukraine
- Oblast: Donetsk Oblast
- Raion: Horlivka Raion
- Hromada: Yenakiieve urban hromada
- Founded: 1898
- City rights: 1925 (Note: Some local historians date the city status back to 3 June 1917, when the Russian Provisional Government in a decree merged settlements into the "city of Yenakiieve", in addition to referring to a 42-member city duma and a 1918 newspaper that says "city of Yenakiieve". Most current sources, however, list 13 March 1925, which is the date of a Ukrainian SSR decree that lists Yenakieevo as being a city in the Donetsk Governorate.)

Area
  - City: 39.2 km^{2} (15.1 sq mi)

Population (2022)
  - City: 76,673
  - Density: 1,960/km^{2} (5,070/sq mi)
  - Metro: 104,857
- Time zone: UTC+2 (EET)
  - Summer (DST): UTC+3 (EEST)
- Postal code: 86400—86470
- Area code: +380 6252
- Climate: Dfb
- Website: Yenakiieve City Council Archived 27 March 2014 at the Wayback Machine

Yenakiieve, also Yenakiyevo (Note: See § Name for alternative spellings and pronunciations.) is a city and the nominal administrative center of Yenakiieve urban hromada in the Horlivka Raion, within the Donetsk Oblast of eastern Ukraine. The city stands on the Krynka River about 60 kilometres (37 mi) from the oblast's administrative center, Donetsk. Its population is approximately 76,673 (2022 estimate), making it the seventh-most populous city in Donetsk Oblast and the 43rd-most populous city in Ukraine.

The city originally started off under the name of Fyodorovka, which gained notoriety in 1895 when it was chosen as the site of the Petrovsky plant, which would become Yenakiieve Iron and Steel Works. In 1898, the settlement was merged to make the settlement of Yenakiieve, named after the founder of the Petrovsky plant, Fyodor Yegorovich Yenakiev. After the October Revolution, it was claimed by the Soviet Union. In 1925, the settlement was granted city status. The city was renamed twice to Rykovo in 1928 and then Ordzhonikidze in 1937, before being changed back to its original name of Yenakiieve after World War Two. After World War Two, the city continued to grow as a major industrial hub, and after the collapse of the Soviet Union became part of an independent Ukraine. In 2014, during the War in the Donbas, the city came under the control of pro-Russian separatists, who incorporated it into the self-proclaimed Donetsk People's Republic. After a highly disputed referendum, the region was annexed by Russia in 2022. As of 2026, Russia has full control of the city.

Yenakiieve remains a large industrial centre in the region of the Donbas, specifically in ferrous metallurgy and mining. The largest employer is the steelmaking Yenakiieve Iron and Steel Works alongside the Yenakiieve Coke-Chemical Plant. However, the city's outdated industry has also caused notable accidents, such as that of the 2008 Ukraine coal mine collapse. Cultural landmarks include Lenin Square, the mass grave of Red Army soldiers, and a monument to cosmonaut Georgy Beregovoy. There are two museums in the city, those being the Yenakiieve Historical Museum and a museum dedicated to Yenakiieve Iron and Steel Works. The city was also formerly home to FC Pivdenstal Yenakiieve, which played in the Ukrainian Amateur Cup, with its home games being at Metalurh Stadium. However, it was disbanded in 2005. The city is also best known internationally as the birthplace of the former President of Ukraine, Viktor Yanukovych, who was in office from 2010 to 2014 until his ousting following months of protests during the Revolution of Dignity, alongside his son, who was a People's Deputy of Ukraine from 2006 to 2014.

== Name ==
=== Current names ===
- Ukrainian: Єнакієве, romanized: Yenakiieve pronounced [jeˈnɑkijewe]
- Russian: Енакиево, romanized: Yenakiyevo

=== Former names ===
- Fyodorovka (Russian: Фёдоровка, romanized: Fedorovka; Ukrainian: Федоровка, romanized: Fyodorovka) 1782-1898
- Yenakiieve (Russian: Енакиево, romanized: Yenakiieve; Ukrainian: Єнакієве, romanized: Yenakiyevo) 1898-1928
- Rykovo (Russian: Рыково; Ukrainian: Риково) 1928-1937
- Ordzhonikidze (Russian: Орджоникидзе; Ukrainian: Орджонікідзе) 1937-1943

=== Name history ===
The original name of the city when it was founded was Fyodorovka, meaning "Fyodor's village". The name comes from the first name of Fyodor Yegorovich Yenakiev, who founded the Petrovsky plant in the territory of Fyodorovka in 1895 together with other Belgian businessmen. The Petrovsky plant would later become the enterprise of Yenakiieve Iron and Steel Works, one of the oldest and largest metallurgical factories of Ukraine. In 1898, when the settlement of Fyodorovka was merged with the other surrounding settlements around the plant to create a singular settlement, the new name of the city became Yenakiieve. Like its predecessor's name, the name is also derived from Fyodor Yegorovich Yenakiev, but this time, coming from his surname to mean "place of Yenakiev". This name would remain for decades until 1928, when it was changed to Rykovo to honour Alexei Rykov, the then Premier of the Soviet Union. Rykovo would not last long, however, as in 1937 Rykov was arrested together with Nikolai Bukharin and accused of treason during the Great Purge, eventually leading to his execution. Due to this, in late 1937, the city was renamed from Rykovo to Ordzhonikidze after another Soviet leader, Sergo Ordzhonikidze, who was People's Commissar of Heavy Industry.

After the Soviets regained the city after a two-year occupation during World War II, the name was again changed from Ordzhonikidze back to the original name of Yenakiieve that was in use from 1898 to 1928. This was possibly in correlation with the beginning of the Russification campaign by Soviet authorities. The name of Yenakiieve would remain for the rest of the Soviet era, and continues to be in use since Ukrainian independence.

== History ==
=== Imperial city ===
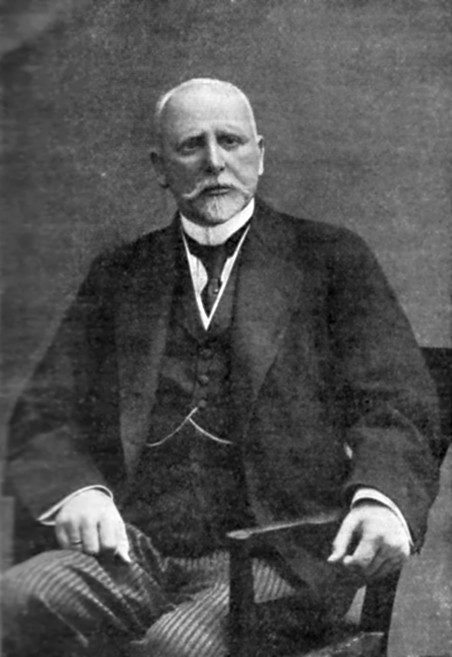
Fyodor Yegorovich Yenakiev, the founder of the Petrovsky Plant, for whom the city was named after.

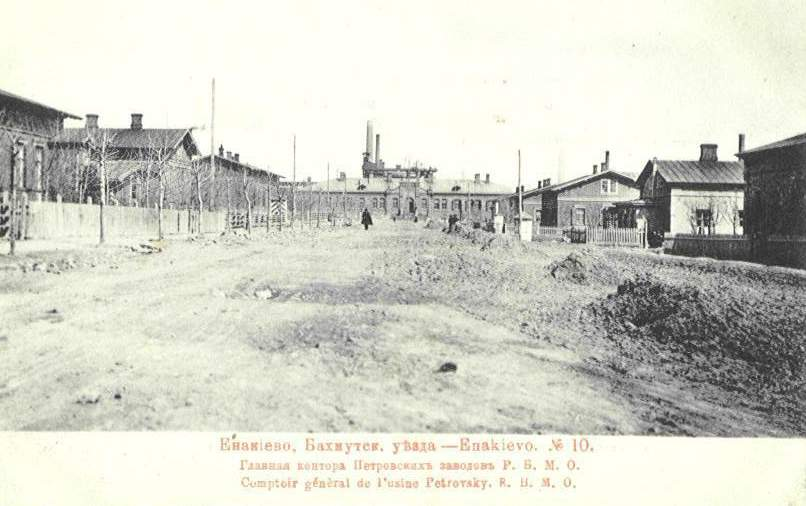
The village of Yenakiieve sometime before 1917, with the Petrovsky Plant in the background.

Permanent settlement around the site of present-day Yenakiieve arose at the end of the late 18th century with the small village of Fyodorovka (Fedorovka), which was specifically founded on the Bulavin River. The small settlement was at least mentioned in the "Lists of Populated Places of the Russian Empire", where it recorded 18 people at the end of the century. At the time of its settlement, Fyodorovka belonged to the Yekaterinoslav Viceroyalty, which soon after became the Yekaterinoslav Governorate. The small settlement started attracting attention in 1858, when near it the Sofiyevsky coal mine was built alongside a pig iron plant on the Sadki River known as "Petrovsky" after Peter I (now in Staropetrovskoye. However, the Petrovsky plant would not last for long as state funding stopped. After the failure of Petrovsky, it was decided to relocate the plant to the village of Fedorovka, which began operations in 1897 with two blast furnaces. This new plant would eventually become the enterprise of Yenakiieve Iron and Steel Works. Parallel to this, new coal mines known as Verovsky, Naryevsky, and Bunge were opened up to connect to the plant by the Krinichnaya to Khatsapetovka railway line. The railway line was served by the new station of Yenakiieve, which was named after engineer Fyodor Yegorovich Yenakiev, who helped open the new Petrovsky plant in 1895 together with B. Yalovetsky and several other Belgian businessmen as a Russian-Belgian metallurgical company.

As people moved to the territory of Fedorovka to work at the plant, numerous settlements grew around the Yenakiieve railway station, with the area having a population of around 15,000 by 1898. In 1898, it was decided to merge the settlements around the railway station and Fedorovka into a single settlement known as Yenakiievsky (also after Yenakiev). The new settlement garnered some attention with the publication of the novella entitled "Moloch" in 1896 by a worker at the plant, A.I. Kurpin, which alleged that the conditions were harsh with 12 to even 15-hour work days and that there were no safety restrictions. In 1899, a new social democratic circle popped up around the plant, with leaflets being distributed by the RSDLP. In 1904, the circle became a part of RSDLP formally. Yenakiieve also soon became embroiled in the Russian Revolution of 1905. Both protests and strikes began, and in November 1905, the first Soviet in the Donbas was created in the settlement, which was headed by local RSDLP leader G. F. Tkachenko-Petrenko. While discussions of an uprising did take place, the detachments of the new Soviet mainly focused on aiding the nearby Horlivka uprising and fighting with Cossacks in that area. In retaliation, many of the members of the Soviet were hanged for participating in the Horlivka uprising.

Yenakiieve continued to rapidly grow despite this as the Petrovsky plant had risen to third place in output volume in the south of the Russian Empire, and new plants were built on its enterprises. In 1912, the Soviet-backed Pravda alleged that despite the rapid growth, the settlement was "hideous" and covered in mud, with people crammed in barracks.

=== Soviet era ===
==== October Revolution ====
After the October Revolution, Grigory Petrovsky was sent to Yenakiieve in order to attempt to garner support for the Bolsheviks and thus the Soviet Union, which by October had around 2,844 registered members. Also, on 16 June 1917, the settlement received the status of city (previously, only three settlements had had the status of city in Donetsk Oblast), which also granted a city duma of 42 people proportionate to the population. Most of the dumas were liquidated for zemstvos in January 1918, although Yenakiieve's remained. In December 1917, the Russo-Belgian Metallurgical Society, which owned the Petrovsky plant, was also nationalised into the Petrovsky State Plants and Mines.

==== Russian Civil War ====
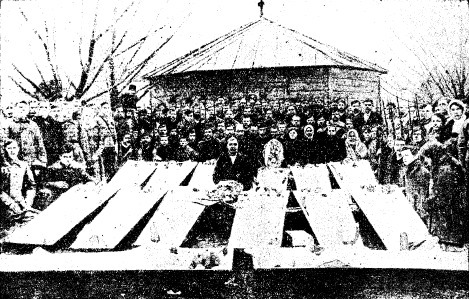
A funeral of people from Yenakiieve who were killed in the onslaught of the Russian Civil War near the Yasynivskyi mine during a battle with the White movement.

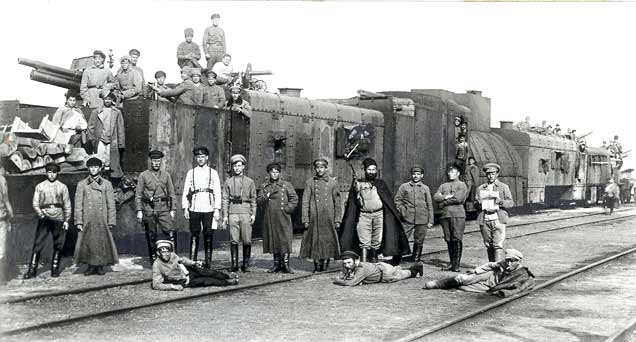
Red Army soldiers near Yenakiieve in 1919.

After the start of the Russian Civil War, it was reported by Soviet sources that around three thousand Yenakiev residents had joined detachments of the Red Guard, obtaining weapons from Petrograd to fight the White movement under Alexey Kaledin. On 7 November 1917, the city was annexed by the Ukrainian People's Republic, and shortly thereafter under the Treaty of Brest-Litovsk, Austro-German troops entered the city after the Battle of Yenakiieve on 18 April 1918. During the Austro-German occupation, an underground Bolshevik committee continued to operate within the city. As Austro-Hungary began to collapse in November 1918 amid the German Revolution, Yenakiieve started striking again, which led the Hetmanate police to retreat while the German garrison stationed in the city behaved passively except for calling 100 Cossack troops.

In the midst of the unrest, on 28 March 1919, the Red Army recaptured Yenakiieve using the 13th Army after having driven out White forces who had retreated from Khatsapetovka to Krinichnaya. Just a few months later, though, in April 1919, the White Army took control of the city, and it became the headquarters of the 1st officer Regiment named for General Markov, which had 1,100 soldiers and was led by Colonel Salnikov. This was done in order to protect the Donets Basin and the railway from Yuzivka to Mariupol from Soviet attacks. A few months later, on 29 December 1919, the 1st Cavalry Army of the Soviet Army again took control over Yenakiieve from the White movement, which would be the last time the city switched hands during the war.

==== Post-war, Holodomor, and Great Purge ====
Yenakiieve, which lost most of the Donbas, was heavily affected by the Russian Civil War. Of the 63 blast furnaces that were present across southern Ukraine, only one at the Yenakiieve plant remained in operation, resuming operations immediately after the last expulsion of White forces. In the aftermath, the city would become one of the leading industrial producers again, already smelting 10 million poods of ferrous metal in 1922. All the mines in the city were renamed in 1924 to follow communisation. During the first five-year plan from 1928 to 1932, work was done on the reconstruction of the city's enterprises, and mechanised coal extraction reached 70%. During this time, the city also became a large agricultural center through the satellite villages nearby during collectivisation. During the prewar Five-Year Plans, around 260,500 square metres of housing in total were built along with sewage and water-supply infrastructure. During this time, the city was also renamed from Yenakiieve in 1928 to Rykovo, after Soviet statesman Alexei Rykov. However, the name would not remain long, as in 1937 the city was again renamed to Ordzhonikidze after another Soviet leader, Sergo Ordzhonikidze. The name was changed from Rykovo after Rykov's arrest in 1937 during the Great Purge.

During the Holodomor, brigades searched households in the city for hidden grain and seed stock and seized foodstuff, with those caught concealing food being sentenced to prison. Documents from this time period within the Donetsk Oblast State Archive allege that brigades broke into homes and put kolkhozs on a "black list" if they failed to meet grain quotas, thus cutting them off from trade. Archival reports also allege widespread starvation by 1932, which led to isolated acts of resistance and anti-Soviet slogans. Like the rest of the USSR, the city was also affected by the Great Purge from 1937-38, with victims of the purges coming from all backgrounds in Yenakiieve. Nevertheless, the local newspaper Znamya Udarnika reported at the time that local rallies endorsed the show trials during the purge by Vasiliy Ulrikh and Andrey Vyshinsky.

==== World War II ====
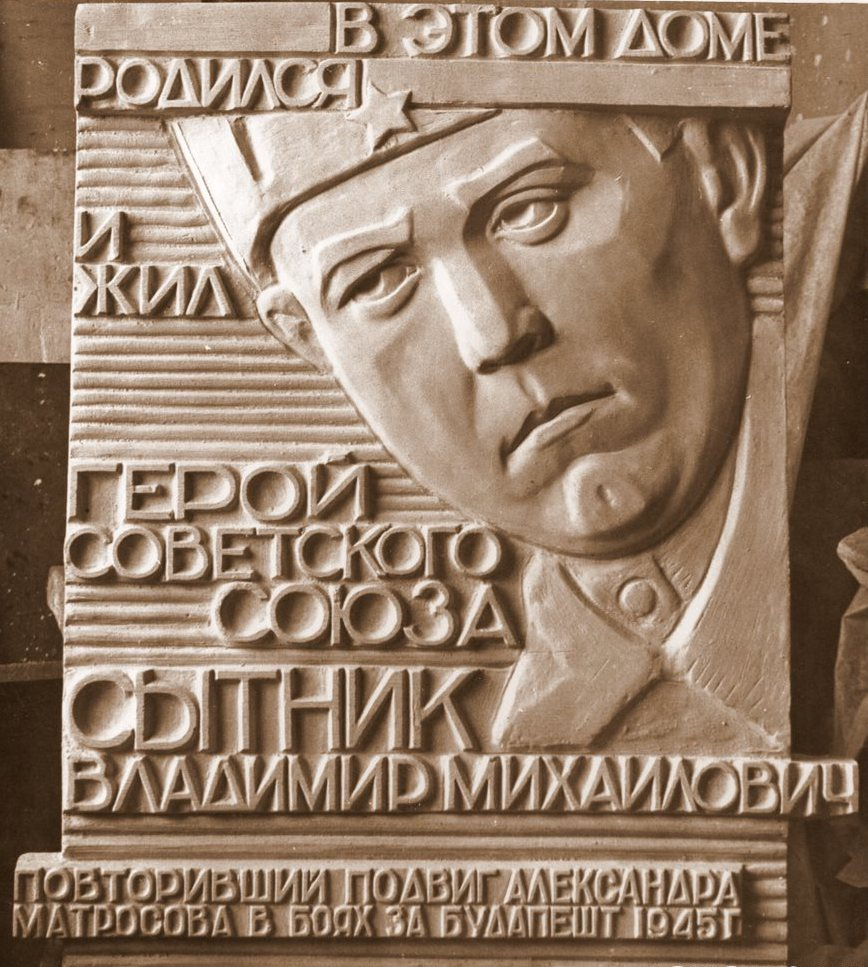
A plaque to Vladimir Sytnik, a Hero of the Soviet Union who was born in the city and died "blocking enemy pillboxes" (referenced as the Matrosov feat) during the Battle of Budapest in 1945.

Upon the outbreak of World War II, many residents left to serve in the Red Army. After the start of Operation Barbarossa, the 8th Department of the 18th Army, which became based in Krasnodon after the Battle of Kiev, began preparations to organise underground partisan detachments in the Ukrainian SSR including in Yenakiieve. As German troops were advancing, the main plant and its specialists were evacuated from the city to Polunochnoye in the Urals. Most of the city's plants were not operational in the Urals until mid-1942 due to a shortage of alloys that were made in Nikopol. During World War II Yenakiieve was under siege from Italian army auxiliary units that were seconded to the German Army. They were followed by German units. Street fighting was fierce between the end of November and the beginning of December 1941.

During the occupation, “Recruitment” of civilians as Ostarbeiter began in December 1941. Yenakiieve did have a partisan unit, which had been planned to work with Krasnodon under a shared operational structure. Partisans received weapons from hidden caches, with recruits receiving training from a NKVD school hidden in Lysychansk. The partisan detachment was led by Pyotr Makarovich Kompaniyets, and it worked with the 15th Rifle Division, who were stuck in a grey area nearby during the winter of 1941. They participated in joint operations on Savelivka, which attacked a German position, and individual sabotage was done within the city, including the burning down of German housing.

As German forces retreated in late 1943, Yenakiieve was finally liberated from Nazi troops on 3 September 1943. Soviet troops had advanced into Yenakiieve after liberating Snizhne after a battle at the height of Savur-Mohyla. The troops involved in the liberation in September were all rifle divisions, consisting of the 34th division, 40th division, 320th, and the 4th. In 1950, about twelve Italian POWs (prisoners of war) were put on trial, over atrocities in Yenakiieve including the destruction of a hospital. Apparently no convictions were registered, and by 1954 all Italian POWs were returned to Italy.

===== Holocaust =====
In early February 1942, the occupation authorities under city commandant Oberst-Leutnant Feist posted orders that required all Jewish people in the city to report to the barracks in Krasnyi Horod, including bringing all their valuables, with non-compliance carrying an automatic death sentence. Many of the Jewish residents did as ordered, believing they were merely being resettled into the ghettos. Other Jewish people had been resettled into ghettos for confinement and not allowed to leave these areas, such as one created in January 1941 in the district of Krasnyi Horod, which the Germans called the "Pale of Settlement." However, on 14 May 1942, the Jewish residents who had reported under the order were loaded into a truck and transported to nearby Horlivka. At Horlivka, as part of the Holocaust, the 555 Jewish people who reported were thrown into the shaft of a mine on the outskirts of the city, and then killed. According to eyewitness testimony collected by Yahad-In Unum in 2011, there was also another mass killing where a column of roughly 100 Jewish people, who were all either elderly or children were marched on foot from the city center to a farm and then shot there at night and buried in a pit. A further witness describes the killings as not fully carried out, as some victims were only wounded and managed to crawl away from the execution say where they were then hidden by villagers, and that some people falsified their papers to be selected for deportation to Germany instead of being killed.

==== Post-war reconstruction ====
Immediately after the Soviets reestablished power in 1943, the city was renamed from Ordzhonikidze back to Yenakiieve, possibly in correlation with the beginning of the Russification campaign by Soviet authorities. However, the damage on the city during the war was immense, amounting to 750 million rubles, with mines being flooded by water and most of the enterprises severely damaged. Nevertheless, by December 1943, the metallurgical plant began work again. Over the following year after the city's liberation, work would be done on moving trains from the Urals and the Kuzbass with the equipment that had been evacuated there. By 1950, all enterprises that had operated in the city prior to the war were restored. After the war, the city continued to grow as a major industrial city, and by 1983 had 31 different enterprises operating within the city.

On 16 September 1979, the Klivazh test was done, which was a peaceful nuclear explosion done as part of the Nuclear Explosions for the National Economy at Bunhe, which is right next to Yenakiieve. The site has been of significant concern since then, as coal was mined from the mine at Bunhe for 23 years afterwards until 2002, when the mine was closed over concerns about what would happen if the mine filled with water, although pumps continued to pump water out of the abandoned mine following its closure.

=== Independent Ukraine ===
==== Russo-Ukrainian War ====
During the war in Donbas the city was captured by pro-Russian separatists when on 13 April 2014 pro-Russian activists captured its town hall and declared that the city was part of the self-proclaimed, separatist Donetsk People's Republic. On 20 April, it was reported that the militants had left the city council buildings and that the flag of Ukraine had been returned to the city council. However, they returned to the city by 4 May, when 300 people seized the city council building and metallurgical plant.

On 7 August 2014, separatists shot down a Ukrainian MiG-29 in the sky over Yenakiieve, presumably from the Buk complex provided by the Russian side; the pilot tried to divert the plane away from residential areas. On 13 August, the metallurgical plant was stopped, according to a statement from the management, "in order to prevent a man-made disaster and save the lives of the townspeople." The work of the treasury and banking system was completely stopped in the city, and the activities of a number of enterprises were suspended. There was a reported shortage of products in the months following the seizure. On 18 November 2014, the first hunger strike took place in the city. On 14 November 2014, Yenakiieve was included in the list of settlements in the East of Ukraine, where the Ukrainian authorities are temporarily not operating.

In 2018, the DPR decided to flood the mine in nearby Bunhe, where the nuclear testing site had taken place, which led to significant concern that the radiation would affect groundwater and the environment. A 2018 report about the state of the city found that the plant was working at best to a third of its pre-war capacity, with damaged parts following a major fire, although the city remained away from the demarcation line compared to Horlivka, so it had never been that targeted by shelling. Food prices were much higher, although medicine prices were lower, albeit in short supply. In general, the city remained less abandoned compared to other cities in the DPR, with roads and most of the pre-war transport working, in part due to the influence of being Yanukovych's home city. A 2020 follow-up report confirmed this, although noting that most of the enterprises had stopped working due to trade blockades and that with the resumption of train services, many young people had left for Russia for job opportunities. In July 2020, the city was de jure transferred into the new Horlivka Raion by Ukrainian authorities as part of administrative reforms, although the Russian-backed authorities do not acknowledge this. A 2024 study found that the concentration in aquifers 5 km from the nuclear testing site had reached above the level of concentration for safe drinking water.

==== 2022 Russian invasion ====
During the start of the 2022 Russian invasion of Ukraine, as part of Russia's mobilisation campaign, it was reported by the General Staff of the Armed Forces of Ukraine that workers from the metallurgical plant in Yenakiieve were possibly being mobilised to fill reserve units. After the 2022 Russian annexations of Southern and Eastern Ukraine, the city is now claimed by Russia itself. This annexation has been rejected by the global community as a breach of international law. Since then, the area around Yenakieeve had seen full-scale fighting, with Russian-installed local officials repeatedly accusing Ukrainian armed forces of shelling the city. Ukraine has said that it is only striking military targets, and not civilian ones.

A February 2023 strike on a lyceum, which was said to be housing Russian personnel, killed a large number of Russian servicemen. On 10 December 2024, there was reportedly a strike on Yenakiieve involving four HIMARS rockets on a Russian ammunition depot in the city, which the Russian-installed leader Denis Pushilin confirmed. No casualties were reported in the strike. A year later, on 14 August 2025, the city came under heavy drone attack in conjunction with the attacks on Rostov-on-Don and Volgograd, with explosions in multiple districts of the city, resulting in a fire. However, no casualties or damage extents were released.

== Geography ==
=== Climate ===
Under the Köppen–Geiger climate classification system, Yenakiieve has a moderate hot summer continental climate (Dfb).

During the summer months, Yenakiieve is warm, with the average temperature in June being 21 °C (70 °F) and July being 24 °C (75 °F). The record high recorded in the city is around 40 °C (104 °F), which was recorded in July. The coldest months are during the wintertime in January and February, when the average temperature is around −5 °C (23 °F) in January and −4 °C (25 °F) in February. The record low recorded in the city is around −34 °C (−29 °F), which was recorded in February. The wettest month by average precipitation is June, which has an average of 60mm of precipitation, with August being the driest at around 34mm of precipitation. The annual precipitation averages to be around 529mm per year.

Climate data for Yenakiieve (1991–2025)
Month	Jan	Feb	Mar	Apr	May	Jun	Jul	Aug	Sep	Oct	Nov	Dec	Year
Record high °C (°F)	11.87 (53.37)	16.31 (61.36)	21.86 (71.35)	28.98 (84.16)	34.77 (94.59)	37.55 (99.59)	40.22 (104.40)	39.70 (103.46)	36.56 (97.81)	33.18 (91.72)	22.35 (72.23)	12.67 (54.81)	40.22 (104.40)
Daily mean °C (°F)	−5.16 (22.71)	−4.13 (24.57)	1.48 (34.66)	9.07 (48.33)	15.29 (59.52)	20.50 (68.90)	23.70 (74.66)	23.11 (73.60)	16.41 (61.54)	8.91 (48.04)	1.76 (35.17)	−3.14 (26.35)	8.98 (48.16)
Record low °C (°F)	−31.94 (−25.49)	−34.30 (−29.74)	−16.96 (1.47)	−6.78 (19.80)	−2.78 (27.00)	3.81 (38.86)	8.03 (46.45)	8.13 (46.63)	−4.04 (24.73)	−7.03 (19.35)	−19.16 (−2.49)	−30.45 (−22.81)	−34.30 (−29.74)
Average precipitation mm (inches)	46.0 (1.81)	39.3 (1.55)	40.1 (1.58)	41.7 (1.64)	52.5 (2.07)	59.5 (2.34)	45.6 (1.80)	33.9 (1.33)	38.8 (1.53)	39.5 (1.56)	43.3 (1.70)	48.9 (1.93)	529.2 (20.83)
Source: NASA Power

== Legal status and politics ==
=== Legal status ===
Starting in April 2014, Luhansk was de facto governed by the Donetsk People's Republic. The Donetsk People's Republic was at that time not recognised internationally, and all UN member states recognised the city as Ukrainian. However, in February 2022, Russia recognised the DPR and the neighboring Luhansk People's Republic as sovereign states, and later that year officially annexed them (along with various other parts of Ukraine that were then at least partially under Russian military occupation). The member states of the United Nations still overwhelmingly considered the areas to be Ukrainian, with only Syria, North Korea, and Russia itself considering them to be Russian.

In the de jure political system of Luhansk, the city was administered as a city of regional significance by Ukraine from its designation until 2020, when the system was abolished during administrative reform. After the administrative reform, the city was de jure included as part of Horlivka Raion alongside the Yenakiieve urban hromada (although Ukraine has never exercised administrative control over the territory since the raion's creation). The city of Yenakiieve was ruled by the Yenakiieve City Council. The City Council Assembly makes up the administration's legislative branch, thus effectively making it a city 'parliament' or rada. The municipal council is made up of 50 elected members, who are each elected to represent a certain district of the city. However, the council has been de facto suspended since 2014.

=== Politics ===
After Ukrainian independence, the city's voters generally favoured the proponents of continued close ties to Russia, namely the Communist Party of Ukraine and the Party of Regions. This is most evident in the presidential elections: during the 2010 election that elected the city's native Yanukovych who represented the Party of Regions, 81.14% of the city voted for him, with 4.94% of the other vote going to Serhiy Tihipko of Strong Ukraine which would later merge with the Party of Regions. Only 3.66% voted for the pro-European candidate Yulia Tymoshenko. Similarly, during the 2004 election in the second round run-off, 97.66% of voters chose Yanukovych over the pro-European candidate Viktor Yushchenko affiliated with Our Ukraine Bloc. In the last local elections for the city in 2010, of the 50-member city council for Yenakiieve all members were for pro-Russian parties: 45 for Party of Regions, 4 for the Communist Party of Ukraine, and 1 for Strong Ukraine.

The city was also represented among political leaders in Kyiv, namely with political representatives of the Donetsk Clan, such as President of Ukraine Viktor Yanukovych, his son, who was a People's Deputy of Ukraine, and Yuriy Ivanyushchenko who was also a People's Deputy of Ukraine and a close associate of the Yanukovychs.

== Demographics ==
=== Population ===
Historical population
Year	Pop.	±%
1923	13,749	—
1926	24,000	+74.6%
1939	88,000	+266.7%
1959	86,000	−2.3%
1979	114,163	+32.7%
1989	120,332	+5.4%
2001	104,266	−13.4%
2022	76,673	−26.5%

According to the 2001 Ukrainian Census, the only official nationwide post-independence census done in Ukraine, the population of Yenakiieve in 2001 was 104,226. The most recent estimate was done by the State Statistics Service of Ukraine in 2022, which estimated that the total population in the city was 76,673. After the population steadily grew from the 13,749 figure first recorded in 1923, the population reached a peak in 1989, just before Ukrainian independence. The population crossed the 100,000 mark from 1979 until 2003. This number has only continued to decline as people have moved away due to the economy and war.

==== Ethnicity ====
Ethnic group	1923	1939	1959	1989	2001
Ukrainians	26.46%	39.51%	38.76%	40.9%	45.3%
Russians	60.26%	52.56%	56.94%	54.7%	51.4%
Jews	8.46%	3.72%	1.51%	0.5%	.2%
Belarusians	0.15%	1.19%	1.86%	1.3%	1.1%

In the 2001 All-Ukrainian Census, the population was nearly evenly split, with 51.4% of people declaring Russian ethnicity and 45.3% declaring Ukrainian ethnicity. In the 1939 census, just before World War II, the population was a majority ethnic Russian at 52.56%, with 39.51% others being Ukrainians, and the Jewish population was at a high of 3.72%. In the 1959 census, after the war, these percentages changed as Russians became more of the majority at 56.94% compared to 38.76% of Ukrainians, with the Jewish population having significantly gone down to 1.51% due to German occupation during the Holocaust, while the number of Belarusians reached a high of 1.86%. In the last All-Soviet census before Ukrainian independence, this trend switched with the number of Ukrainians going up to 40.9% and the number of Russians going down to 54.7%, while the number of Jewish people continued to go down dramatically alongside the number of Belarusians. Yennakiieve remains one of three cities within Donetsk Oblast where Russians have made up the majority of the population over time and is also still only one of three cities in Donetsk Oblast where the population is majority ethnically Russian.

=== Language ===
Language group	1923	1926	2001
Ukrainian language	26.43%	16.86%	9.78%
Russian language	60.20%	71.54%	89.44%

According to the 2001 All-Ukrainian Census, Luhansk's majority population had a mother tongue of Russian as their native language (89.44%), with a minority speaking Ukrainian as their mother tongue (9.78%). A 2006 unofficial language study also found similar numbers of 86.0% speaking Russian as a mother tongue and 14.0% speaking Ukrainian. There was also a small number speaking Armenian (0.19%) and Belarusian (0.08%). The exact mother tongue language distribution is as follows:

Language

- Russian: 89.44%
- Ukrainian: 9.78%
- Armenian: 0.19%
- Belarusian: 0.08%
- Romani: 0.03%
- Bulgarian: 0.01%
- Romanian: 0.01%
- Greek: 0.01%

== Media ==
=== Newspapers ===
The city's oldest and most important newspaper is known as Yenakiievskyi Rabochyi (Russian: Енакиевский рабочий, romanized: Yenakiieve Worker), which was first published in December 1917 as a Soviet organ newspaper. It initially ran as a monthly subscription with advertising, although publishing ceased during the Russian Civil War. Once it restarted in June 1920, it became known as "The Path of the Soviets", although it took on many short-lived titles during this time, and started only appearing once or twice a week. It continued being used as an organ of the city during the rest of the Soviet era, although it switched to being exclusively Russian-language after previously also doing copies in Ukrainian. The paper adopted its current name in 1943 after the city was liberated from the Nazi occupation. Prior to 2014, it was published twice weekly in Russian with official documents and some articles in Ukrainian. After the city's seizure by the DPR, the newspaper continued to function in the city, except now under the DPR state enterprise "Media Group Yenakiieve". It was reported in 2016 that the newspaper is currently the only one present in Yenakiieve and is heavily aligned with DPR state messaging.

=== Radio ===
Yenakiieve does not have its own FM radio station. In January 2014, just before the war, it was proposed by the mayor to create one on the basis of the existing Yenakiieve Radio Company through a budget of 97 thousand hryvnias, but the war stopped all plans for this.

=== Television ===
The city used to have a local television channel known as ETV (ЄТБ), which began broadcasting in 1992 on channel 8. It aired films, announcements, and local news. However, ETV stopped broadcasting in 2006 after having switched to become a retransmitter of the nationwide channel Novyi Kanal. In 2023, work was done to open a new television studio in the city through broadcaster LenTV24. However, the studio was only intended to provide segments for the regional broadcaster, not to be its own television channel.

== Religion ==
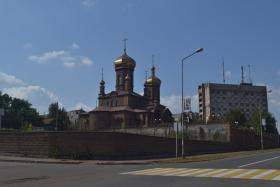
Cathedral of the Intercession of the Holy Virgin in Yenakiieve

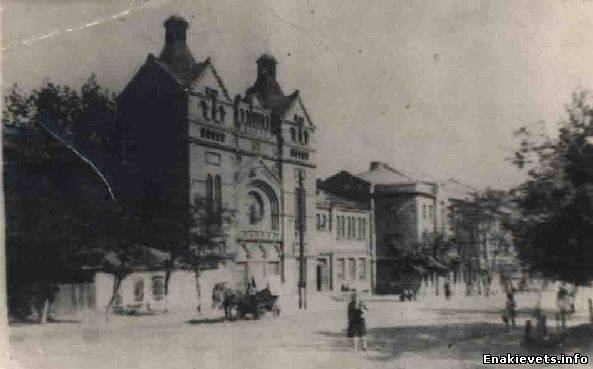
Synagogue in Yenakiieve.

The largest presence of religion is the Ukrainian Orthodox Church (Moscow Patriarchate), which has numerous churches and cathedrals within the city, administered as the Yenakiieve deanery of the Horlivka-Sloviansk eparchy. The central church in the city is the Cathedral of the Intercession of the Holy Virgin on Metallurgov Avenue, with the archpriest of the city currently being Aleksiy Suyetin as of 2026. Other Orthodox churches in the city include the Nikolaevsky Church on Lenin Street, the Spiridonovsky Church on Filtrovalnaya Street, Georgievsky Church, a church dedicated to Saint Nicholas the Wondermarker, among others. The most important church in the city, besides the Church of Intercession, is the Church of Saint George the Victorious, which was initiated under Viktor Yanukovych and the first stone consecrated on 8 December 2006 by Metropolitan Ilarion of Donetsk and Mariupol. The new church holds up to 800 people, and was finally completed on 6 May 2010, when Yanukovych presented an antique icon of St. George called "The Miracle of St. George and the Dragon" to the church.

The city also used to have a notable Jewish community, prior to the Holocaust. The earliest Jewish people came in the 1890s, working as merchants, but were heavily discriminated against with a tax and admission quota. A synagogue was built in the city in the early 1900s, which was funded by the community and operated until the Soviets forcibly closed it in 1930, even without the formal request that was normally required. After the synagogue's closure, it was used as a cinema, then a theatre, and then finally a house of culture. It was never restored, and instead, the Jewish community meets in the apartment of members.

== Culture ==
=== Attractions ===
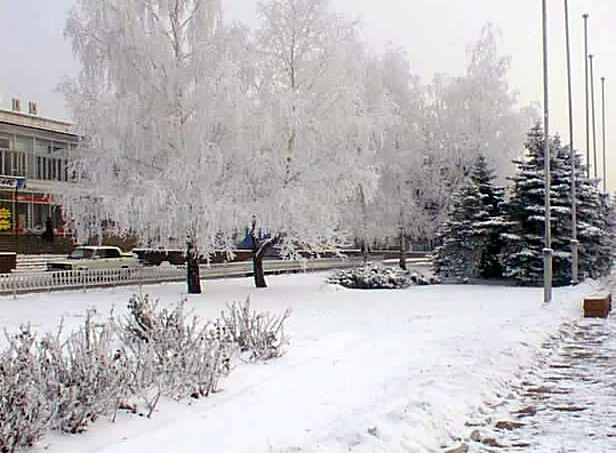
Lenin Square

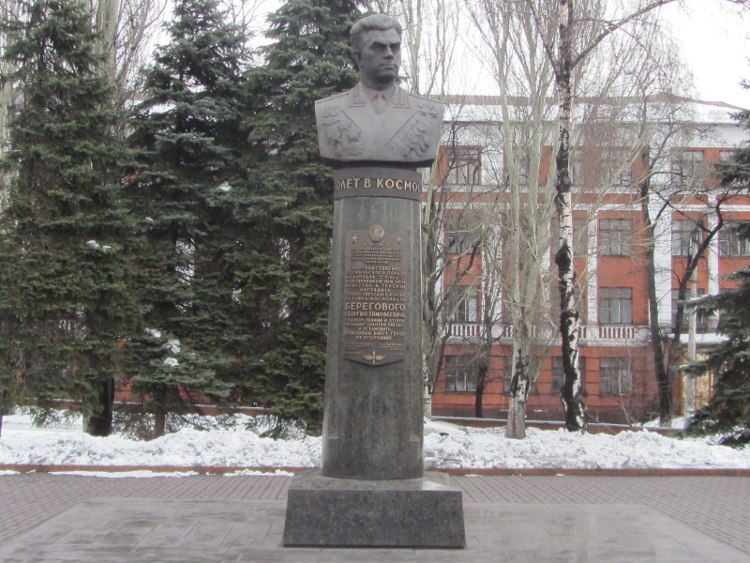
Monument to Georgy Beregovoy.

The central square of the city is Lenin Square. It is home to a monument to Vladimir Lenin and an eternal flame. It was announced in 2025 that the square would undergo major reconstruction, which would add to and renovate the monument and flame. There is also a bronze bust of Georgy Beregovoy, which is located in the park named after him in the city center. It is opposite to the former Cinema Ukraine (renamed after the DPR took control). The bust was constructed by Soviet authorities since he was a Hero of the Soviet Union, and although he was born in Poltava Oblast, Beregovoy requested the monument to instead be in Yenakiieve since he considered it his hometown. It was approved in 1969 and stands 1.5 metres tall on a 4.5 metre pedestal designed by Hryhorii Postnikov and Yuriy Lapin.

There are also multiple war memorials located within the city. The most notable of these is a mass grave for Red Army soldiers who were killed in the liberation of the city in 1943, which is located within the old cemetery. There is also a mass grave of Cossacks who died during World War One located at the old Bozhkovo cemetery, which is marked by a horseshoe and a Cross of St. George carving. It is the oldest surviving monument in the city. In addition to this, there is a memorial Yakov Sverdlov and a Monument to Labour Glory known popularly either as "Communist Veksel" or "Communist Promissory Note". The other well-known buildings in the city are the Roman Catholic Church of Teresa of Calcutta, the former Ukraine Cinema, the entrance arch to Voznesensky Park, and the Ilyinka Vladimir icon church. In May 2026, Leningrad Oblast announced that it had undertaken extensive restoration of the city's war memorials ahead of Victory Day.

=== Museums ===
There are two museums in the city: the Yenakiieve Historical Museum named for Georgy Beregovoy and the Yenakiieve Metallurgical Plant museum. The historical museum was opened in 1967 as a branch of the Donetsk Polytechnic Institute, but was closed soon after and revived in 1977. In 1979, it became a branch of the Donetsk Oblast Museum of Local History, until 1992, when it was granted independent status as a museum solely dedicated to Yenakiieve, undergoing major renovation thereafter. In the late 2000s, there were five exhibition halls dedicated to archaeology, history until 1939, Yenakiieve during World War II, the life of Georgy Beregovoy, and a dedicated room to local personalities. In the mid-2010s, the museum was renamed in honour of Georgy Beregovoy, who resided in the city during his early childhood. It had around 15,000 items during this time, including 600 on Beregovoy with a scale model of the Soyuz descent module and some of his spacesuits.

The other museum is dedicated to the Yenakiieve Iron and Steel Works enterprise, and it opened up in 2004 to mark the plant's centennial. It was opened up initially at the former Metalurh workers' club. The museum is organised by themes with materials on the plant's directors, employees who were Heroes of the Soviet Union and Heroes of Socialist Labour, and on families who worked at the plant. It also regularly screens a documentary about the plant done by Dovzhenko Film Studios.

=== Sports ===
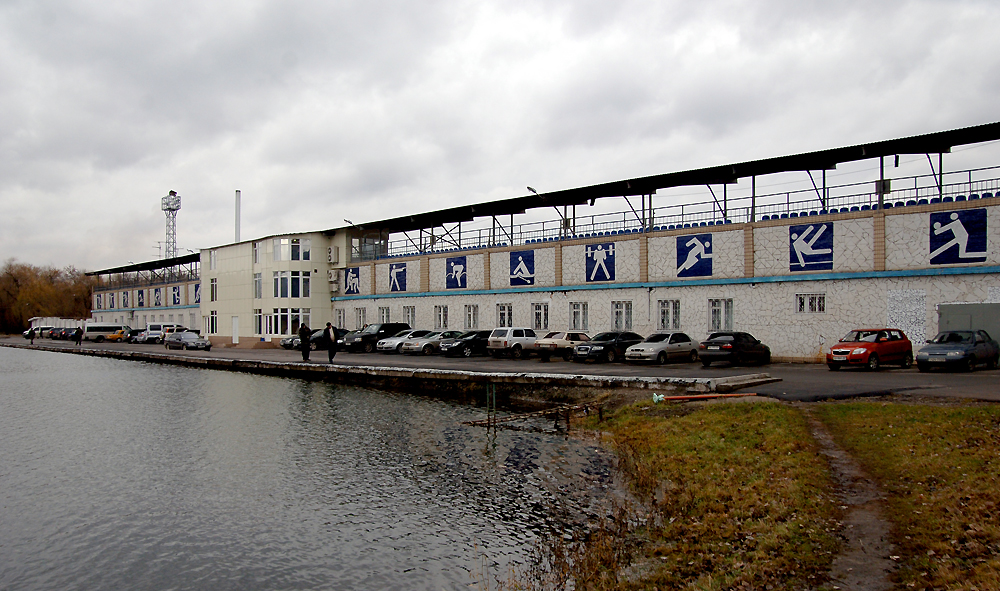
Metalurh Stadium.

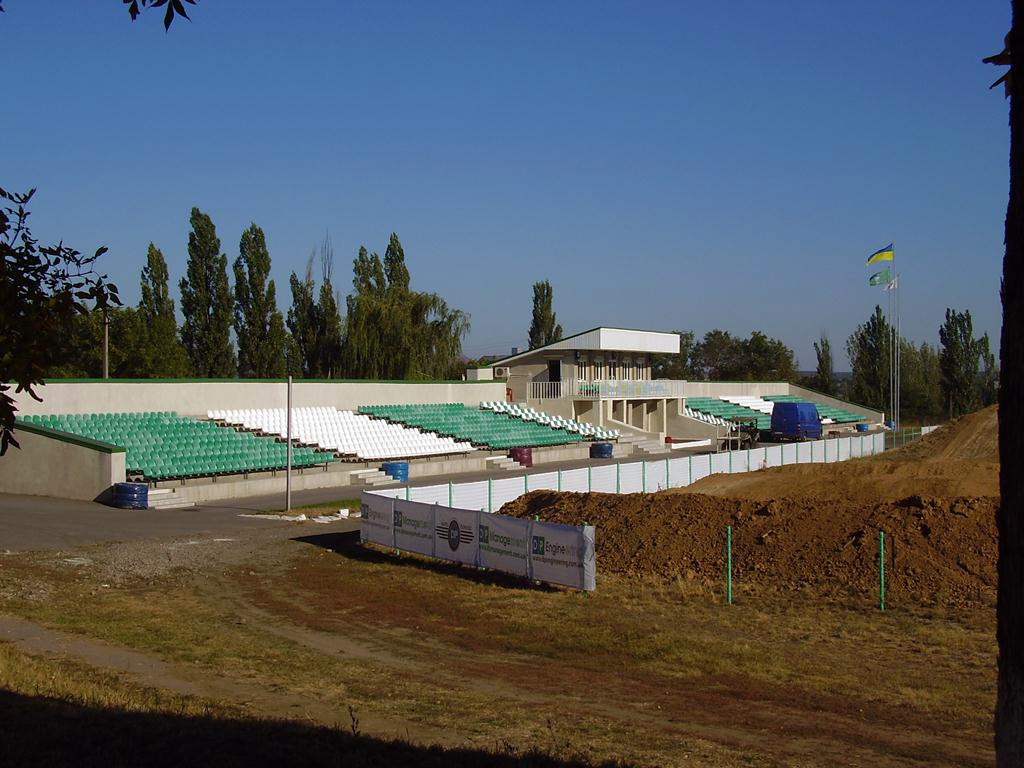
Shaktar Stadium.

Yenakiieve was the home to FC Pivdenstal Yenakiieve, which played in the Ukrainian Amateur Cup and existed from 1913 to 2005. It was initially the team of the Petrovsky plant, but rose in prominence in 1962 after a Yenakiieve native from Zenit Leningrad, Alexei Pshenichny, coached the team to win the Donetsk Oblast football championship to earn promotion to Soviet Second League B. Under coach Yuriy Klokov in 1987, the club had its most prominent year, winning the Football Cup of the Ukrainian SSR and thus getting to play in the Soviet Cup. The club later won the Ukrainian Amateur Cup in 2001. The club last played in the 2004-05 Ukrainian Amateur Club, finishing second in its group before disbanding. Later on in 2007, a branch of the Children's and Youth Football Academy, which was established by Shaktar Donetsk to recruit young children, was opened. As of 2021, the academy trains around 100 children. In addition to football, the city is still home to a motoball club known as "Metallurg" which is housed in the Soyuz-3 Stadium.

There are three stadiums within the city, although the most prominent one is Metalurh Stadium, which was the home ground of the football club before it closed. The other prominent stadium is Soyuz-3, which continues to host motoball. The stadium underwent major reconstruction in August 2013 with financial backing from Yanukovych and Ivanyushchenko. After the reconstruction, it houses 2,248 seats. In 2024, it was announced that a sports complex would start construction that would include a football field, basketball court, and area for training.

=== City symbols ===
==== Coat of arms ====
The first coat of arms that was proposed was in 1967, which featured most of the elements that are present on the design today: central was a blast furnace of the Yenakiieve Iron and Steel Works in the colour of fire, with the background being half black and yellow in reference to coal from the region being known as black gold. The shield was French-framed. It took until July 1990 for the coat of arms to be approved, but only in its description form, not the actual image, which was heavily based on the 1967 design, except for having an azure stripe at the top with the inscription of "Yenakiieve" in Russian at the top. In 2007, a coat of arms in its entirety was finally approved by the council, but the colours changed with the furnace becoming gold, and it divided the background into black and red. There was also a shield added and a wreath with an inscription of Yenakiieve in the center.

After 2014, the DPR continued to use the coat of arms approved in 2007. However, in 2024, the Russian-controlled authorities approved a modification of the coat of arms. This new modification heavily changed the coat of arms to have a brick furnace with a scarlet flame, with the background being divided between black, white, and red with a silver pelican at the top (in reference to the family coat of arms of F.E. Yenakiev).

==== Flag ====
The flag of the city was approved on 22 August 2007 alongside the coat of arms. It is rectangular with an aspect ratio of 2:3 and features a yellow blast furnace in the middle, with the background being divided diagonally between black and red. In 2024, alongside the Russian-controlled authorities changing the coat of arms, they also changed the flag to be a spread-out version of the shield without the crown.

Ukraine-recognized Flag of Yenakiieve

Ukraine-recognized Coat of arms of Yenakiieve

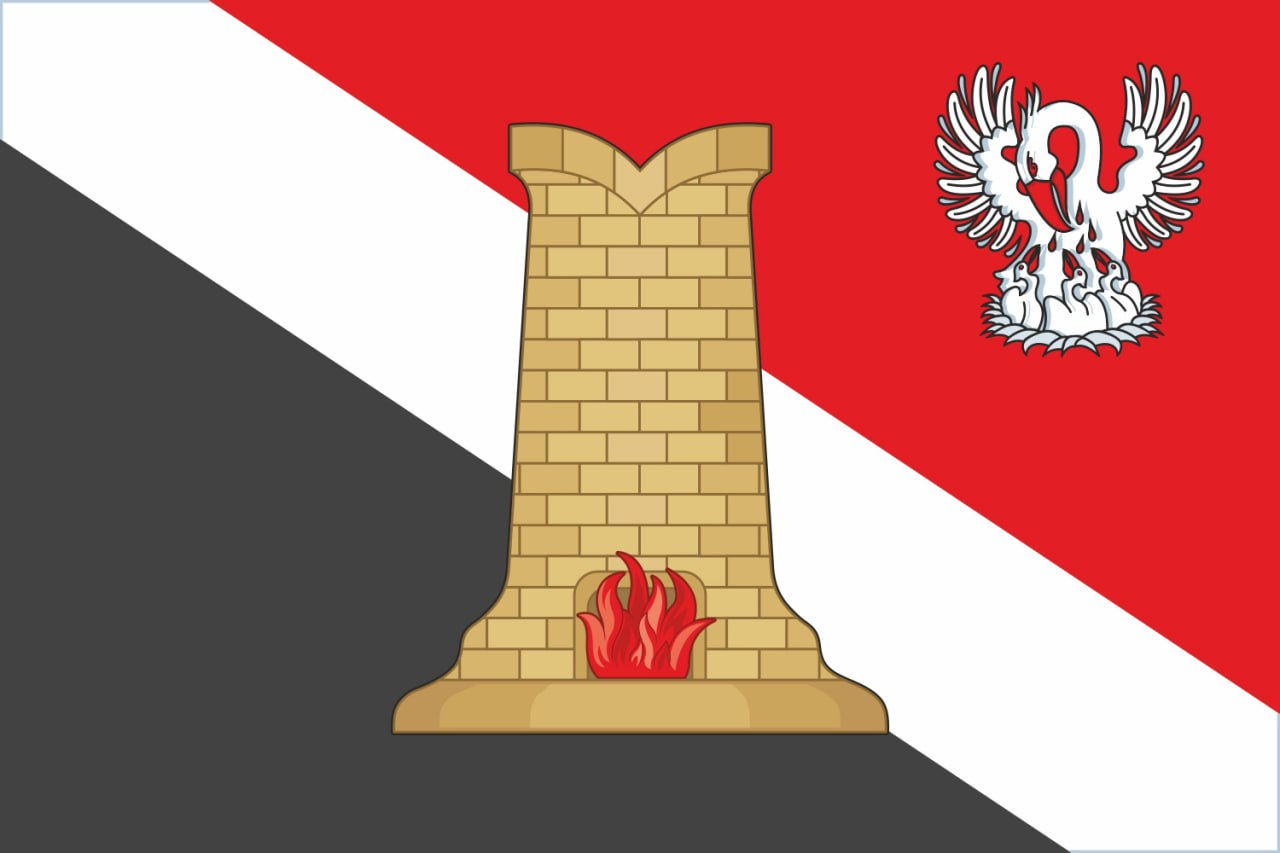
Russia-recognized Flag of Yenakiieve since 2024

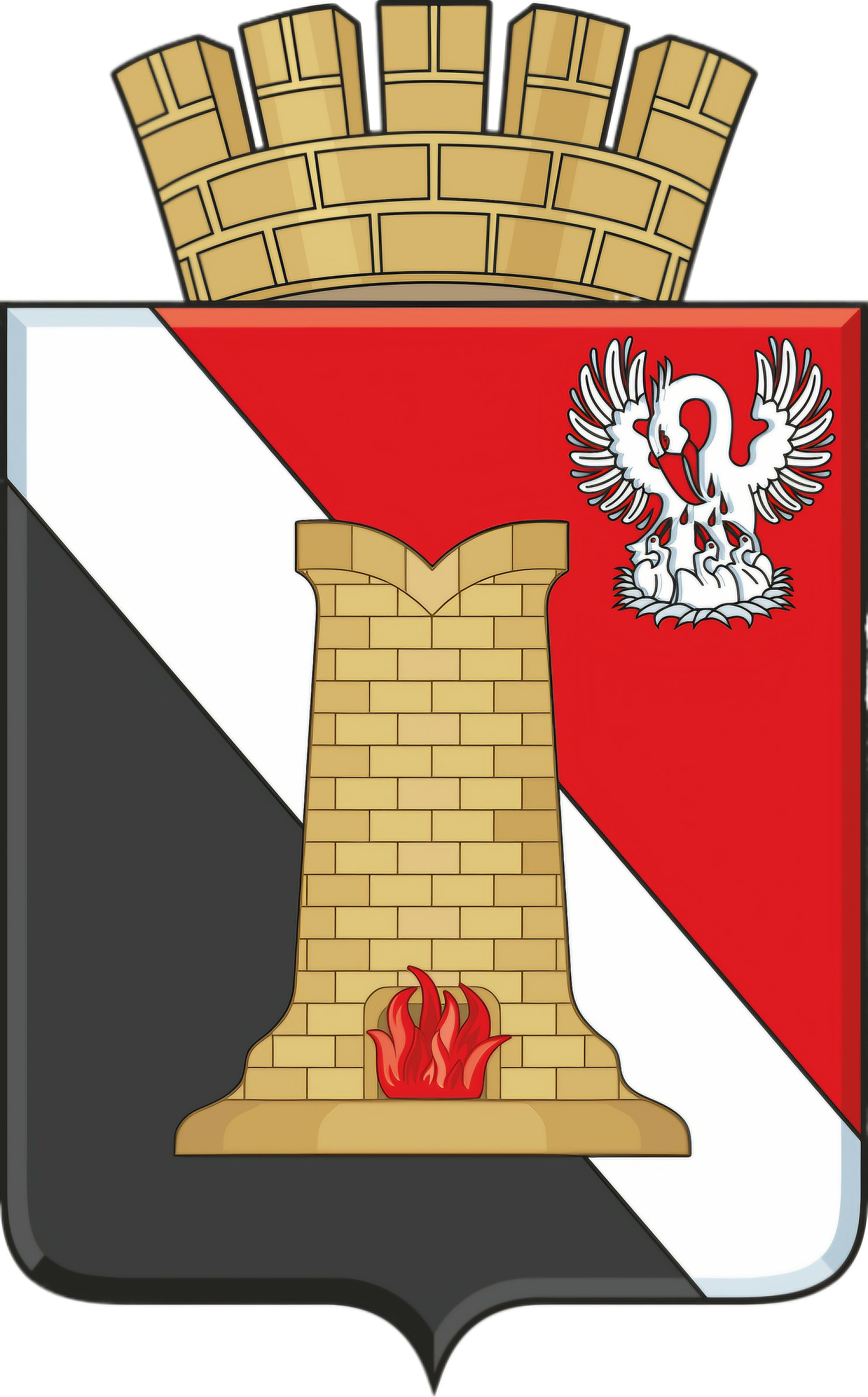
Russia-recognized Coat of arms of Yenakiieve since 2024

== Economy ==
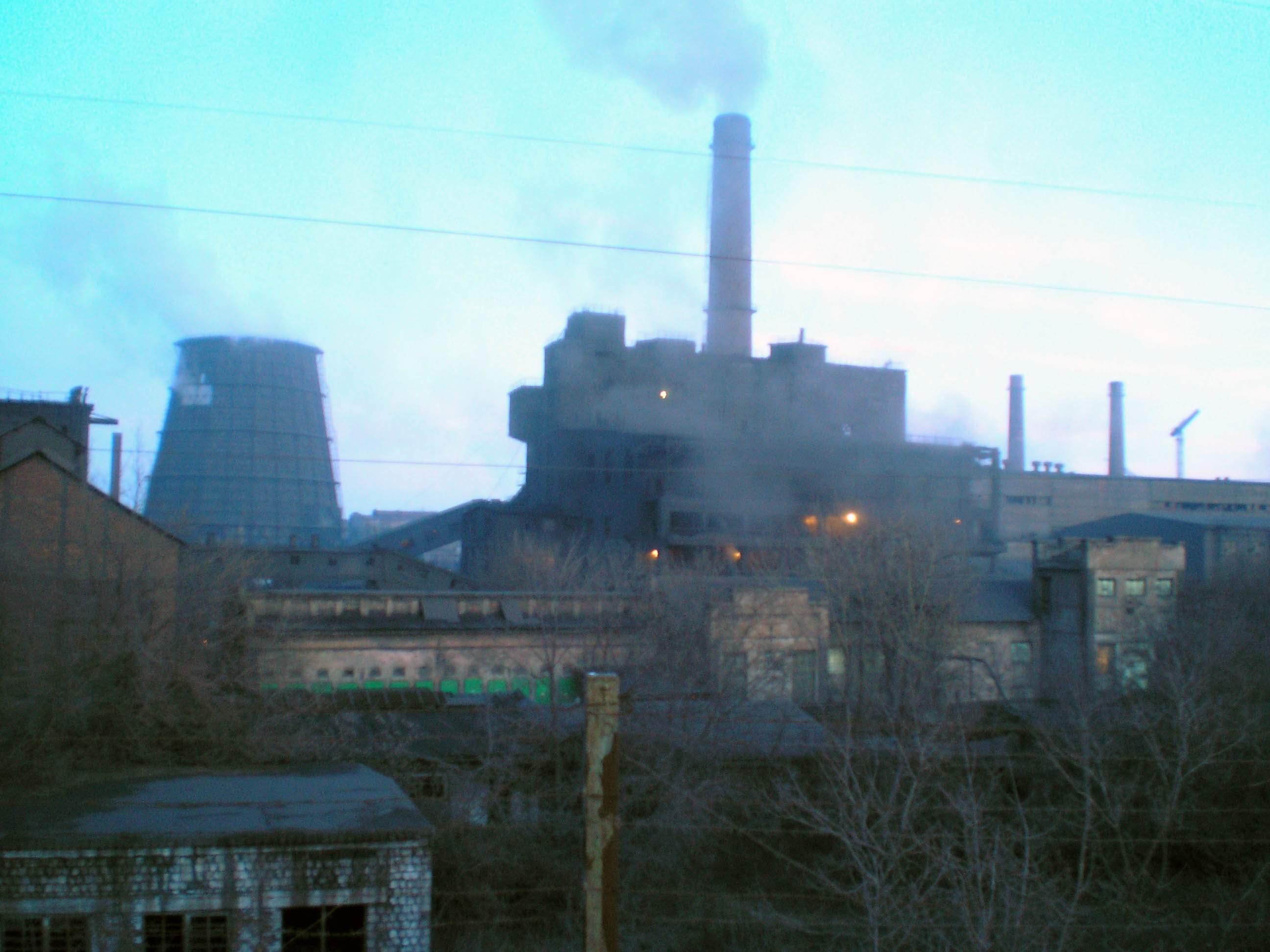
Yenakiieve Iron and Steel Works.

Yenakiieve is one of the largest industrial centres in the Donbas and within Donetsk Oblast. The city's most notable enterprises have historically been coal mining and ferrous metallurgy. As of January 2026, occupation authorities have recorded 2,328 small and medium businesses in the city. Retail trade is the largest share of these businesses.

The most famous and leading enterprise in the city is the steelmaking enterprise known as Yenakiieve Iron and Steel Works. It was founded in 1895 as a joint Russian and Belgian project. After Ukrainian independence, it became part of Metinvest, and in 2013 received a large investment of $360 million to build a new agglomeration factory. After the DPR took over, they de facto integrated the factory as a branch of the Yuzhny Mining and Metallurgical Complex producing iron ore agglomerate, pig iron, and cast billets, although de jure it still remains under Metinvest. The other famous enterprise in the city is the Yenakiieve Coke-Chemical Plant, which is one of the oldest coking enterprises in Donetsk Oblast. It produces around twenty types of products. In the mid-2010s, after having bankruptcy proceedings, Metinvest also bought a controlling stake in the plant, which by then operated three coke batteries and employed 1,130 people. In 2017, Metinvest lost all control of the plant, and it de facto became part of Vneshtorgservis, a sanctioned company operated by politician Vladimir Pashkov which manages confiscated industries. Under Vneshtorgservis, the financial performance has dropped sharply and went into net loss in 2017-18.

Other enterprises within the city include the coal-mining association Ordzhonikidzeugol, which operates six mines in the city. In March 2025, it was de facto put into liquidation. There is also the Yenakiieve Boiler-Mechanical Plant, a cement plant, a municipal dairy plant, and other industrial enterprises.

== Education ==
=== University education ===
There are three higher-education institutes in the city. The first of these is the Yenakiieve Metallurgical Technical College, which was established in 1929 and has trained over 35,000 people in technical skills. The college's departments consist of mechanical and metallurgical studies, automation, and software engineering. The second higher education institute is the Yenakiieve Technical College of Economics and Management, which was opened in 1970, and became a commercial technical college in 1991 and affiliated with Donetsk National University.After the DPR takeover, it was de facto reconstituted as part of the Donetsk National University. It has two academic buildings. The last higher education institute is its associated Yenakiieve Training and Consultation Centre, which has also acted as a subdivision of Donetsk National University since 1992.

In a 2006 study, it was found that 9.73% of the higher education population received their schooling in Ukrainian, with 90.27% receiving their schooling in Russian.

=== Secondary education ===
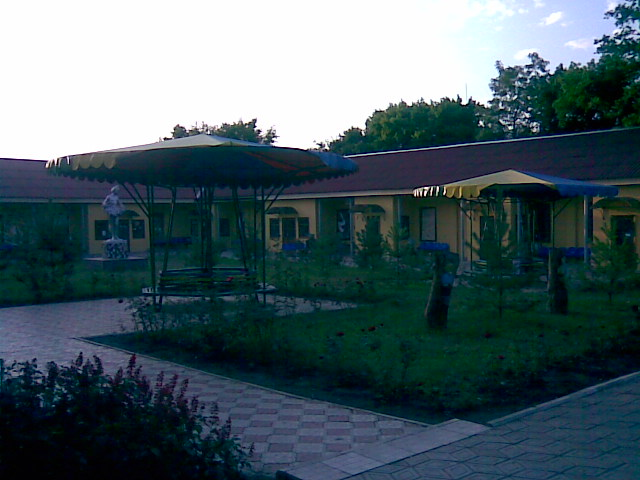
A school named after V. Dubinin in Yenakiieve.

There are currently 25 secondary schools within Yenakiieve. Most of the schools are numbered schools, except one named after Mariya Batrakova and another after Beregovoy. There are also two specialised schools: a lyceum for information technologies and a boarding school.

In a 2006 study, it was found that in secondary schooling in Yenakiieve, only 4.6% of respondents indicated they received their schooling primarily in Ukrainian, with the majority, 95.4%, receiving their schooling in Russian. However, at the same time, there was an increase in the number of fully Ukrainian language schools in the city, going from 5 in the 2007-08 school year to 9 out of the 25 secondary schools in the 2012-13 school year.

=== Public libraries ===
There are multiple libraries within the city. The first libraries appeared prior to 1917 as a collection of the Petrovsky plant in addition to a separate fee-based library for the city's patrons. Currently, the city's libraries operate under a municipal administration that consists of a singular central library, a children's library, and branches in nearby settlements. The most important library in the city is the Central City Library named after Alexander Kuprin (who wrote the novella Moloch), which is located at Lenin Square. It holds around 98,400 volumes of work and as of the mid-2020s, has 4,200 registered readers. It hosts multiple events and commemorations in the city. The other library is the Central Children's Library on Metalurhiv Avenue. In 2025, it was designated as a "model library" under the Russian-installed authorities under the Russian State Library. It currently has 30,000 works for children and has around 2,100 registered users. Another smaller library includes a dedicated library for blind residents that was opened in 2014 through an investment by Metinvest. The library holds Braille-formatted books, large-print books, audiobooks, and music recordings, and serves 180 registered users.

== Infanstructure ==
=== Transportation ===
==== Trams ====
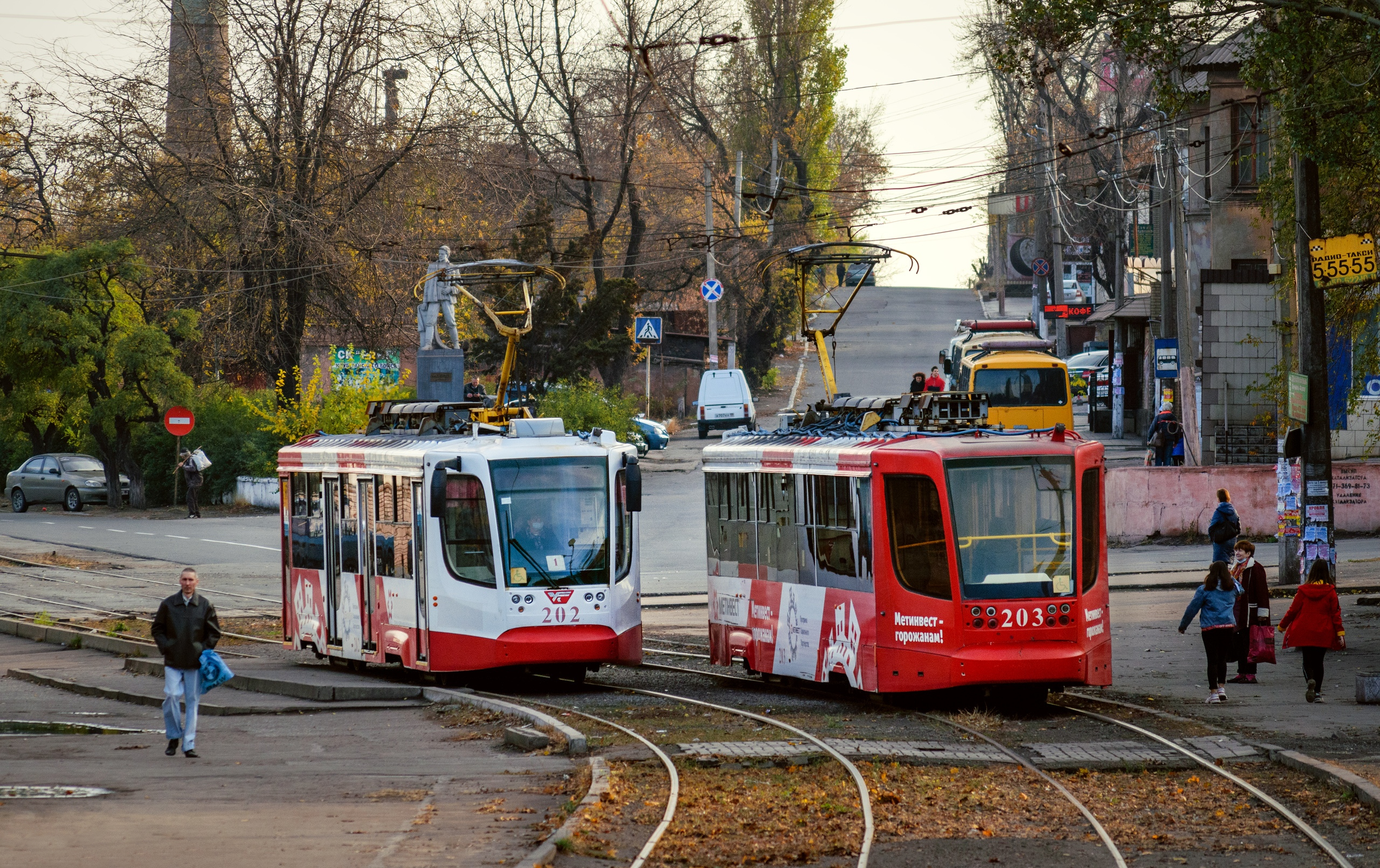
Two 71-623 trams running a route in Yenakiieve.

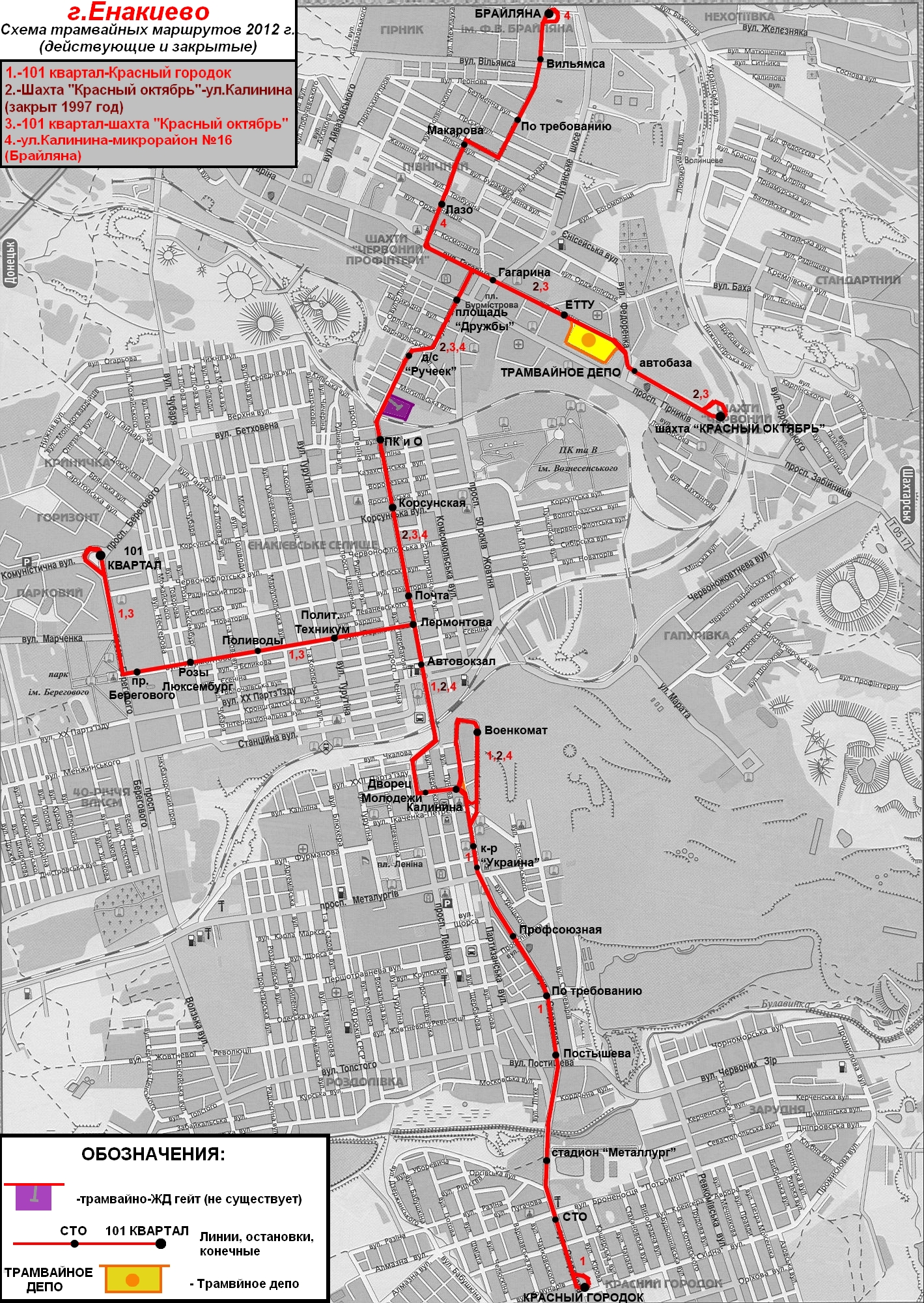
Map of the tram routes in Yenakiieve from 2012.

The tram network in the city first began on 24 May 1932 with a Kh tramcar running the inaugural route no. 1 from the plant to a bridge near the river, with a second route being added shortly thereafter. During German occupation in World War II, the two tram lines and the depot and substations were completely destroyed, with it taking until 1948 for the network to be entirely restored. A new depot was added in 1972, although in the mid-1990s, route 2 was closed due to low ridership. The last new route was added in 1992 with route 4, although from 1994 to 1997 Yenakiieve was one of the first cities in Ukraine to receive Ukrainian-manufactured tram cars. They were eventually removed from passenger service by 2007 due to design flaws. Thus, prior to 2014, the system heavily relied on old Soviet-era KTM-5 trams manufactured by UKVZ. More than 30 were running daily across the three routes in 2005, with 42 of the 55 KTM-5's being preserved from the Soviets. Yenakiieve was one of the few cities to retain this model well after independence, as many others had retired.

In 2012, the city received three new 71-623 trams. Since the DPR's takeover in April 2014, the tram system has continued to run, unlike many other cities' systems in the DPR. Since 2022, Leningrad Oblast has provided the system with new material due to the oblast being designated a "patron region" to Donetsk Oblast after the unrecognised annexation. Six older Leningrad trams were donated in August 2022, and in November 2024, new contact wire was provided. By early 2025, the system's old depot was restored alongside more trams being donated, according to the DPR leader Yevgeny Solntsev. In early 2025, Route no. 1 began a major reconstruction project after it was deemed unsafe, which is expected to cost more than a billion rubles. At the same time, however, the director of the enterprise for the tram system, Vasily Lavrinenko, has said that the tram system in the city is under serious strain. He said in an interview that the enterprise was severely understaffed, with multiple employees being conscripted to fight in the Russian invasion. Of the fleet of 13 cars, 10 of which were from Leningrad and three from the previous system, only four were operating because the city could find no qualified drivers due to the wages being low. It was also reported that the enterprise was not receiving much money due to extensive fare exemptions.

===== Routes =====
The routes shown here are from 2002, pre-dating the conflict. Route No. 2 has been discontinued since the 1990s:

- Route No. 1: Cheryomushki to Red Town
- Route No. 3: Cheryomushki to Mine "Red October"
- Route No. 4: Braylyana Street to Voyenkomat

==== City buses ====
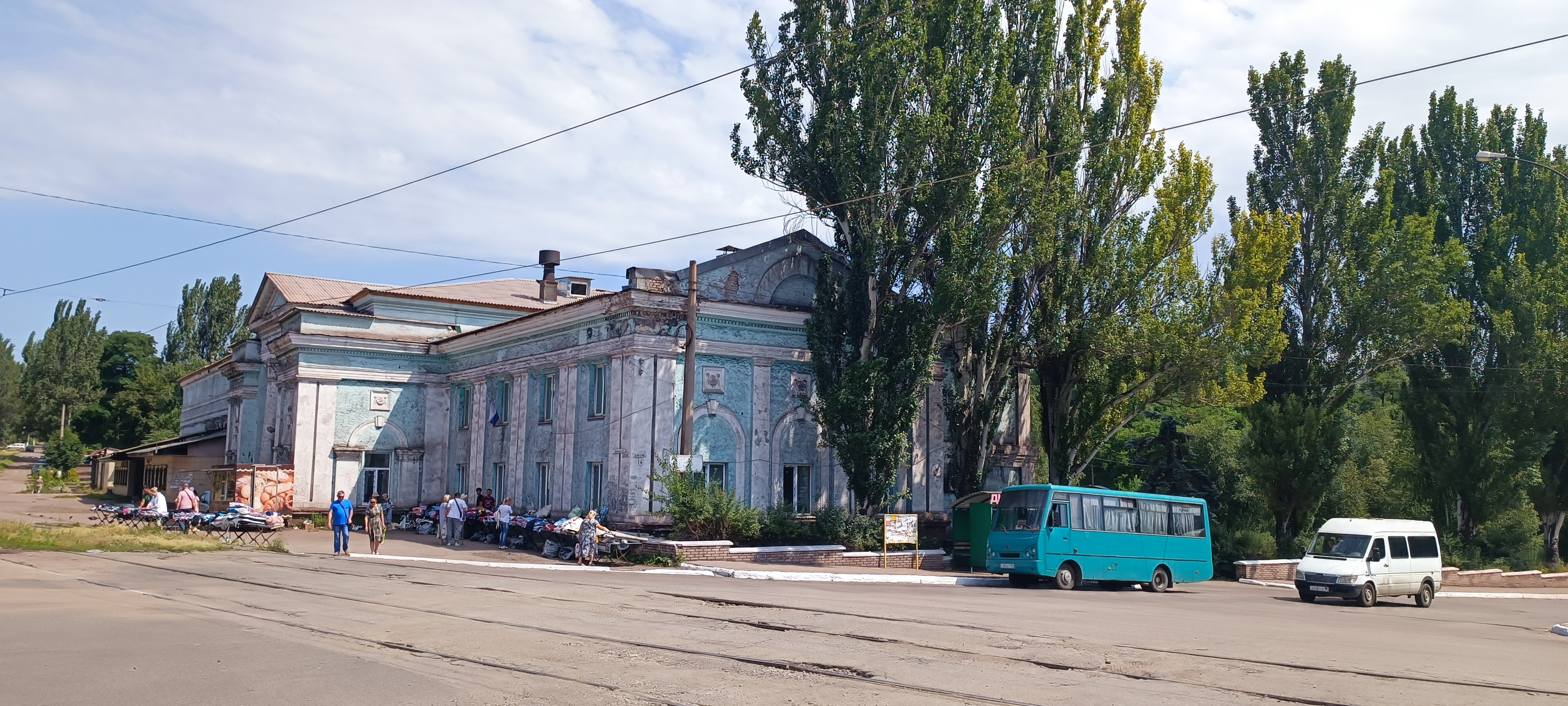
Buses in Yenakiieve.

City buses and Marshrutkas are the most common form of transport in Yenakiieve. All bus service in Yenakiieve was disrupted because of the war for months after the DPR's takeover. However, by September 2014, it was reported that bus service between Donetsk and Yenakiieve had been restored, although at a reduced schedule compared to prior. The number of buses was said to be increasing by October 2014, running restored intercity routes, although some near the demarcation line remained suspended indefinitely. Since then, the bus routes and fleet have remained stagnant until June 2022, when Leningrad Oblast donated older PAZ buses. At the time, it was reported that the fleet had not received a new bus in over 20 years prior to this. In February 2024, ten new buses were also added.

===== Routes =====
The routes shown here are from early 2014, pre-dating the conflict. The number in parentheses is the route number:

- Route No. 1 (1): City of Yenakiieve to YHT to Vatutine village
- Route No. 2 (1A): City of Yenakiieve to YHT to Vatutine village
- Route No. 3 (2): City of Yenakiieve to Vatutine village
- Route No. 4 (3): City of Yenakiieve to Rozdolivka village to "40th Anniversary of October"
- Route No. 5 (4): City Hospital No. 7 to Burmistrov Square
- Route No. 6 (5): City of Yenakiieve to the settlement of 1905
- Route No. 7 (8): City of Yenakiieve to DBK (Housing-Building Combine)
- Route No. 8 (9): City of Yenakiieve to Standartny village
- Route No. 9 (10): Yenakiieve Metallurgical Plant to Hornyak microdistrict
- Route No. 10 (11): Vatutine village to Hornyak microdistrict
- Route No. 11 (12): Vatutine village to Yunokomunarivsk
- Route No. 12 (15): City of Yenakiieve to Krasny Horodok village
- Route No. 13 (16): City of Yenakiieve to Vatutine village (circular)
- Route No. 14 (19): Yenakiieve bus station to Savelivka village
- Route No. 15 (20): Krasny Horodok village to Vatutine village
- Route No. 16 (21): City of Yenakiieve to Vuhlehirsk
- Route No. 17 (23): City of Yenakiieve to Bulavynske village
- Route No. 18 (24): City of Yenakiieve to Olkhovatka settlement
- Route No. 19 (28): City of Yenakiieve to Korsun settlement
- Route No. 20 (29): City of Yenakiieve to Yunokomunarivsk
- Route No. 21 (30): City of Yenakiieve to Karlo-Marksove settlement
- Route No. 22 (34): City of Yenakiieve to Sofiyivka village to Karl Marx mine
- Route No. 23 (36): City of Yenakiieve to Druzhne village

==== Roads ====
The European route European route intersects through the city. It was also formerly a site as an intersection of the Ukrainian international high way, M04, which connected Znamianka to the border with Russia. However, in April 2020, M04 was de jure decommissioned and merged with M12 to form the new M30 route, although Ukraine did not control the route in Yenakiieve. In terms of the T-network, the territorial route, it was also formerly connected to T 0511, which had a total length of 26 km and connected Yenakiieve to the city of Khartsyzk, and T 0517, which had a total length of 45.5 km and connected Yenakiieve to Shakhtarsk going on to Amvrosiivka.

==== Railways ====
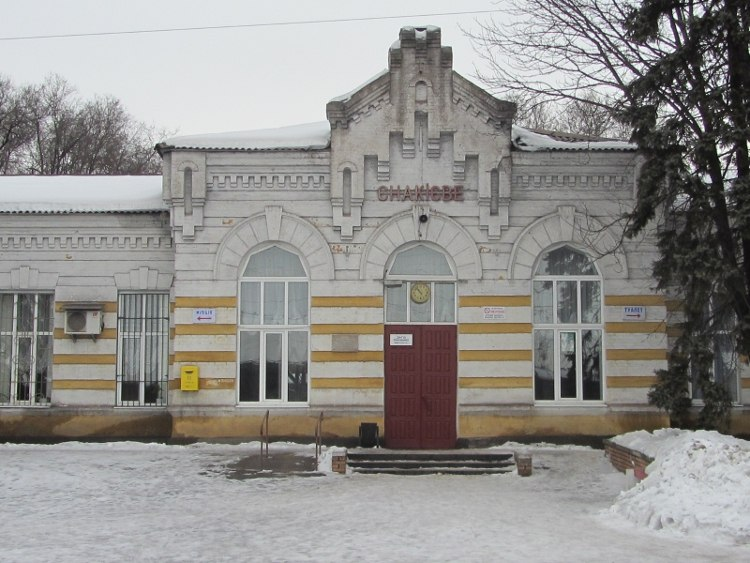
Main building of the Yenakiieve railway station.

The city is served by the junction railway station Yenakiieve railway station. The railway system that operated in the city was Donets Railway as part of the Vuhlehirsk–Krynychna line of the Krasnyi Lyman directorate, which was used until 2023, when the Russian assets of the railway were merged to make the Railways of Novorossiya. The railway, prior to 2014, was served by regular trains to the cities of Yasynuvata and Nyzhnia Krynka. Railway transport started in the city in the 1890s with a private rail that was constructed for the Petrovsky plant and mines called "Petrovsky Post". It was three versts long, with a bridge being built to the private station. By the early 1910s, the station was renamed to Yenakiieve station, with it handling over 64 million poods of freight annually. The vast majority of the line was tied to the plant and the mines, with the company supplying the station. By 1917, the station was an important node for trains bound from Luhansk to Pokrovsk, as all trains ran through Yenakiieve, although this complicated travel. Since then, the railway has transitioned to civilian use.

Due to the war, on 27 August 2014, Donets Railway temporarily suspended passenger service to Yenakiieve due to the fighting alongside 11 other stations with long-distance trains moving to Mariupol and Kostiantynivka instead. In March 2015, the DPR said that using the seized assets of the railway they had acquired during the war, they had restored a suburban service train through the city known as train no. 6603/6004. The train ran from Yasynuvata to Luhansk, with a stop at both Yenakiieve and Debaltseve stations, going three times a week in each direction. Ukrzaliznytsia stopped providing cash tickets entirely to stations in occupied Donetsk Oblast in February 2015.

==== Air transport ====
There are no airports located within the city. The closest one is in the city of Donetsk at the Donetsk International Airport. However, the airport was completely destroyed during the War in the Donbas.

=== Energy ===
During early Soviet times, Yenakiieve was connected to the electricity grid during the GOELRO plan. A 110 kV transmission line connected the Zuivska Power Station in Zuhres to Yenakiieve through Yuzivka and Horlivka. This line was one of Ukraine's first three closed-loop high-voltage transmission circuits as GOELRO planned to connect the Donbas's network together. The regional energy enterprise Donbasenergo is responsible for the line and Yenakiieve's electricity.

=== Water and sanitation ===
Voda Donbasu (Вода Донбасу) provides water and sanitation services to Yenakiieve. The city's water supply is heavily reliant on the Siverskyi Donets – Donbas Canal, supplying the filtration station in Yenakiieve. In a 2019 paper, it was identified that there is no alternative water-supply route besides the canal. Locally, the Volyntsivske Reservoir on the river, which was commissioned in 1934, also sometimes provides a supplementary water source for Yenakiieve and the nearby cities in Horlivka Raion. However, the reservoir, even prior to 2014, has suffered from eutrophication due to it being a waste site for municipal enterprises and mine water. The contamination has been severe enough that water use from the reservoir has been suspended multiple times, forcing the city to use the canal entirely instead.

==== Water supply issues ====
Since 2014, the water supply crisis in the Donbas has particularly hit Yenakiieve hard. In October 2014, water supply from the Siverskyi Donets – Donbas Canal was limited to Yenakiieve, and after the DPR's takeover, operations at the local reservoir ceased. In 2017, due to the water supply issues in the city, the reservoir was changed from being a reserve water source to being in continuous status despite the contamination of the water. By 2020, it was reported that due to the mines not being dewatered since the end of 2017, contamination of local water, turning it bright orange and red-brown, was reported. This, combined with the potential for water contamination due to the flooding of the nuclear testing site near Bunhe, led Pushilin to flag Yennakiieve's water supply as an acute problem in the DPR. However, conditions have not improved since, despite a further 2023 pledge with the construction of the Don-Donbass water pipeline. In June 2025, water supply to both Yenakiieve and Debaltseve was completely halted for the restoration of the filtration station. It was further reported that the local reservoir was almost completely dried up due to a lack of precipitation, while the Siverskyi Donets-Donbas canal has been partially destroyed during the war.

== Notable people ==
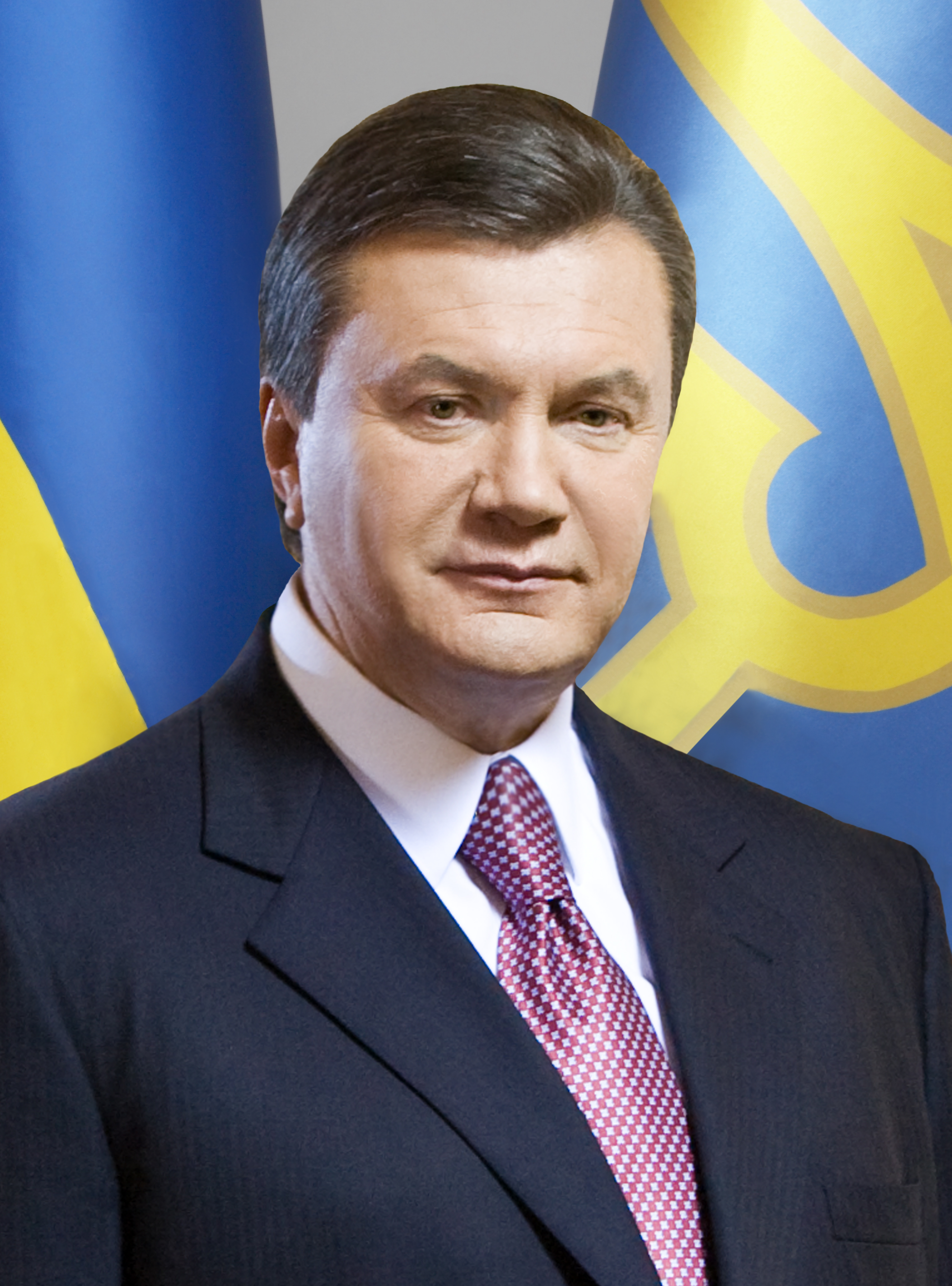
Viktor Yanukovych, who was the former President of Ukraine until his ousting during Euromaidan, is from Yenakiieve.

- Olena Akopyan (born 1969), Ukrainian swimmer and gold medalist at the 2004 Summer Paralympics
- Yuri Bogatikov (1932-2002), Soviet-Ukrainian singer, People's Artist of the USSR
- Aleksander Burba (1918-1984), Soviet organizer of industry and education, scholar of chemical and metallurgical technologies
- Ivan Managarov (1898-1981), Soviet colonel general and Hero of the Soviet Union
- Georgy Beregovoy (1921-1995), Soviet cosmonaut and commander of Soyuz 3
- Oksana Mysina (born 1961), Ukrainian-born actress and director
- Volodymyr Troshkin (1947-2020), Ukrainian footballer and coach
- Mykyta Burda (born 1995), Ukrainian football player
- Yuriy Ivanyushchenko (born 1959), Ukrainian politician, economist and businessman
- Viktor Yanukovych (born 1950), former President of Ukraine
- Lyudmyla Yanukovych (born 1949), former First Lady of Ukraine
- Viktor Yanukovych (born 1981), former People's Deputy of Ukraine

== Gallery ==
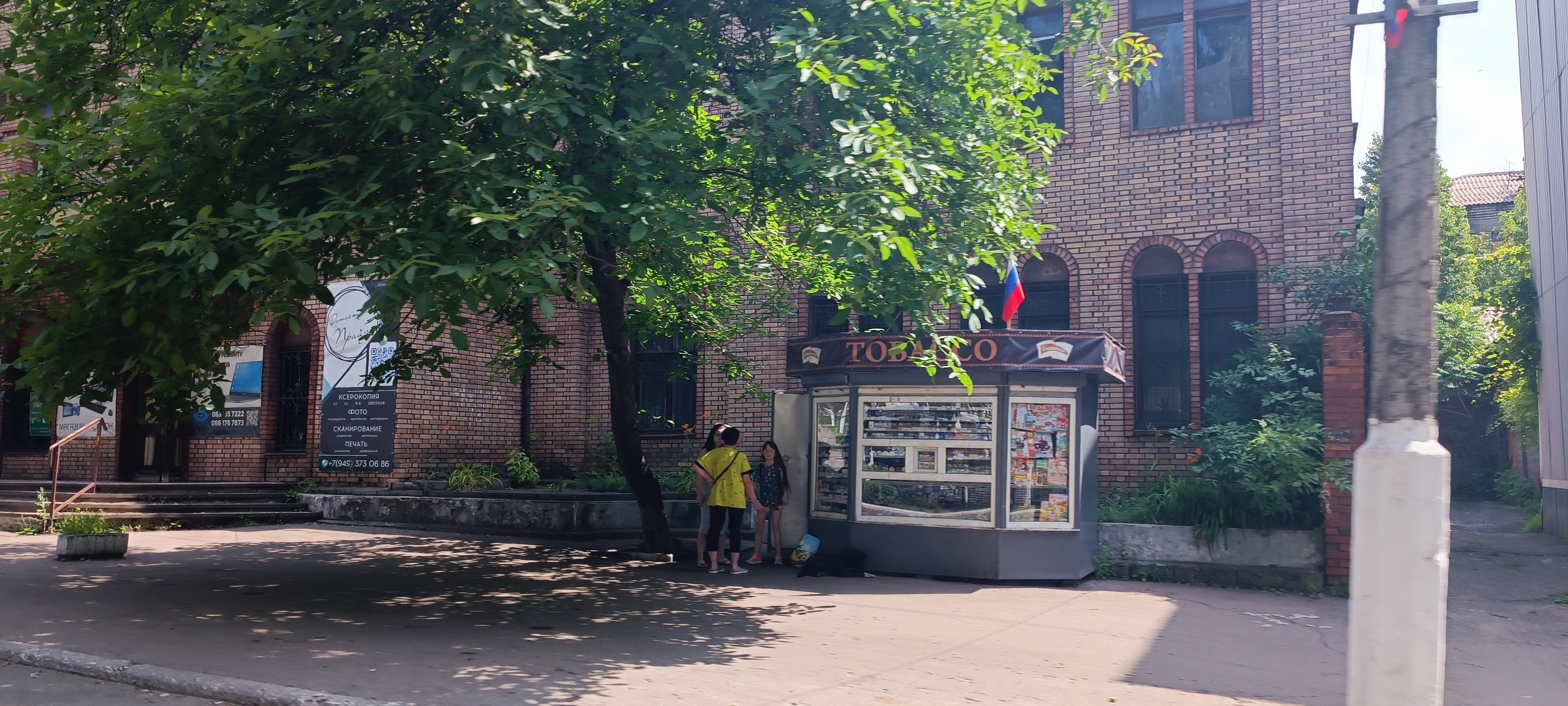
Lenin Avenue

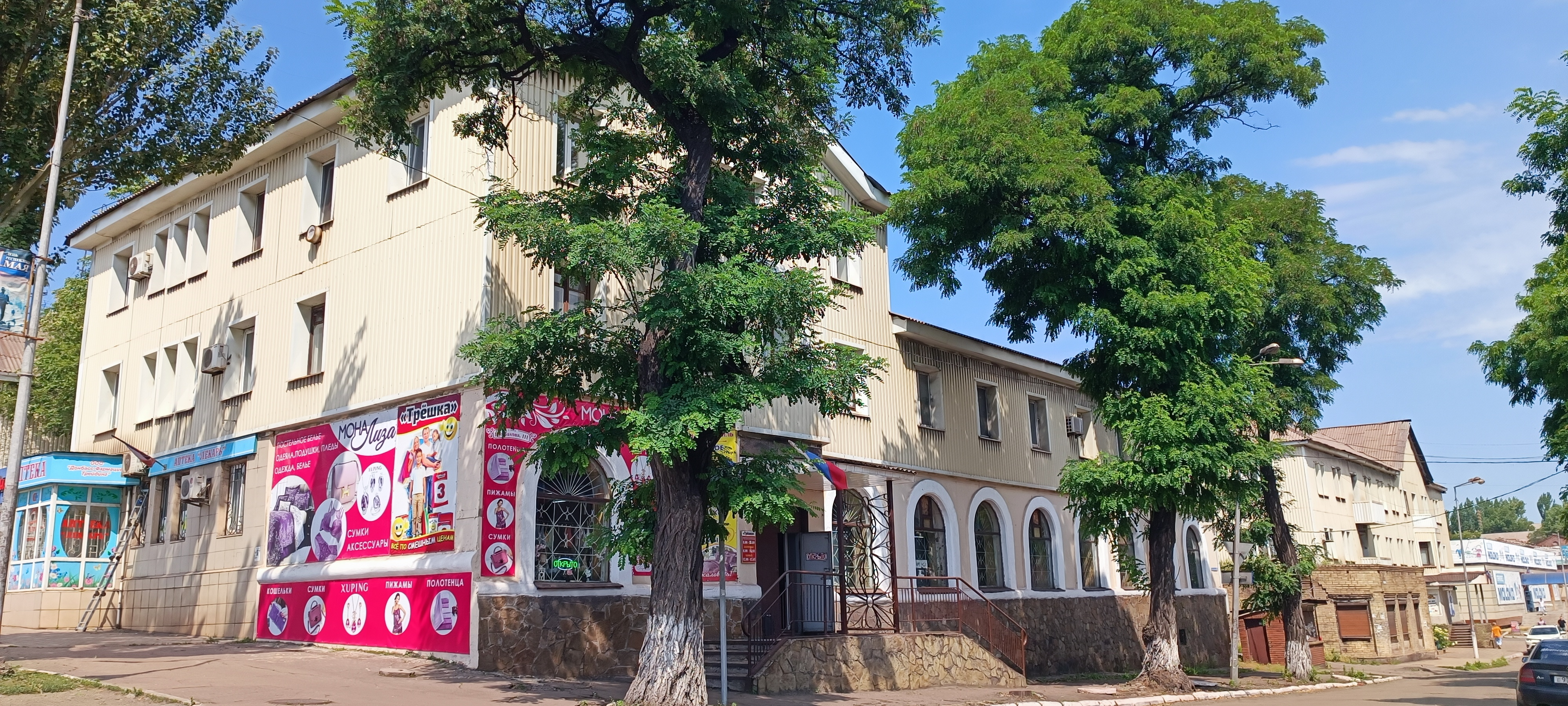
A street in Yenakiieve

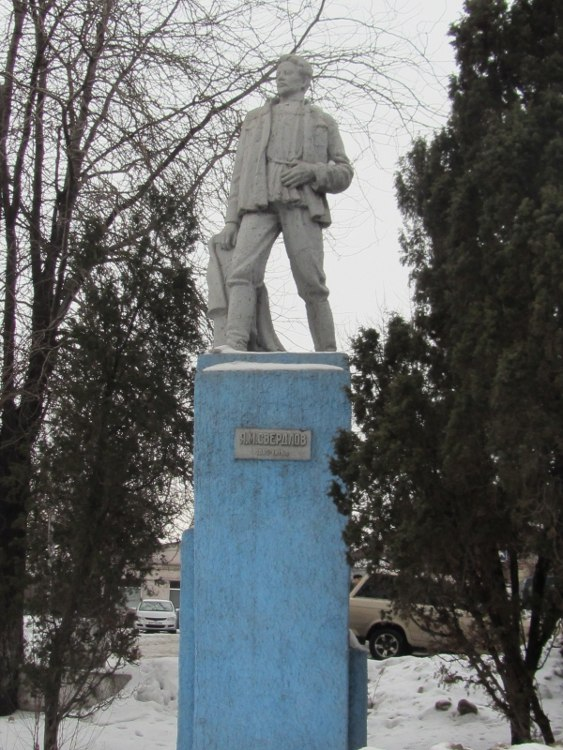
Monument to Yakov Sverdlov

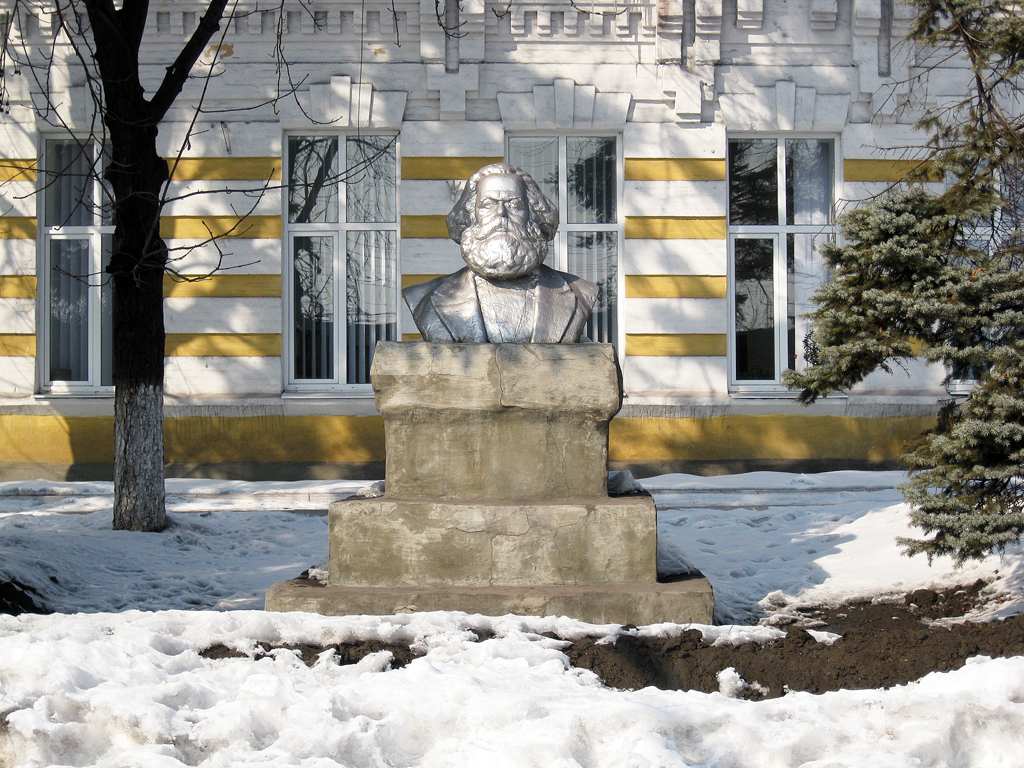
Bust of Karl Marx

== Sources ==
- АРУТЮНОВ, И. М. (1983). ЕНАКИЕВО: Путеводитель. Донбасс.
