= Yuri Bogatikov =

Yuri Bogatikov Юрій Богатиков
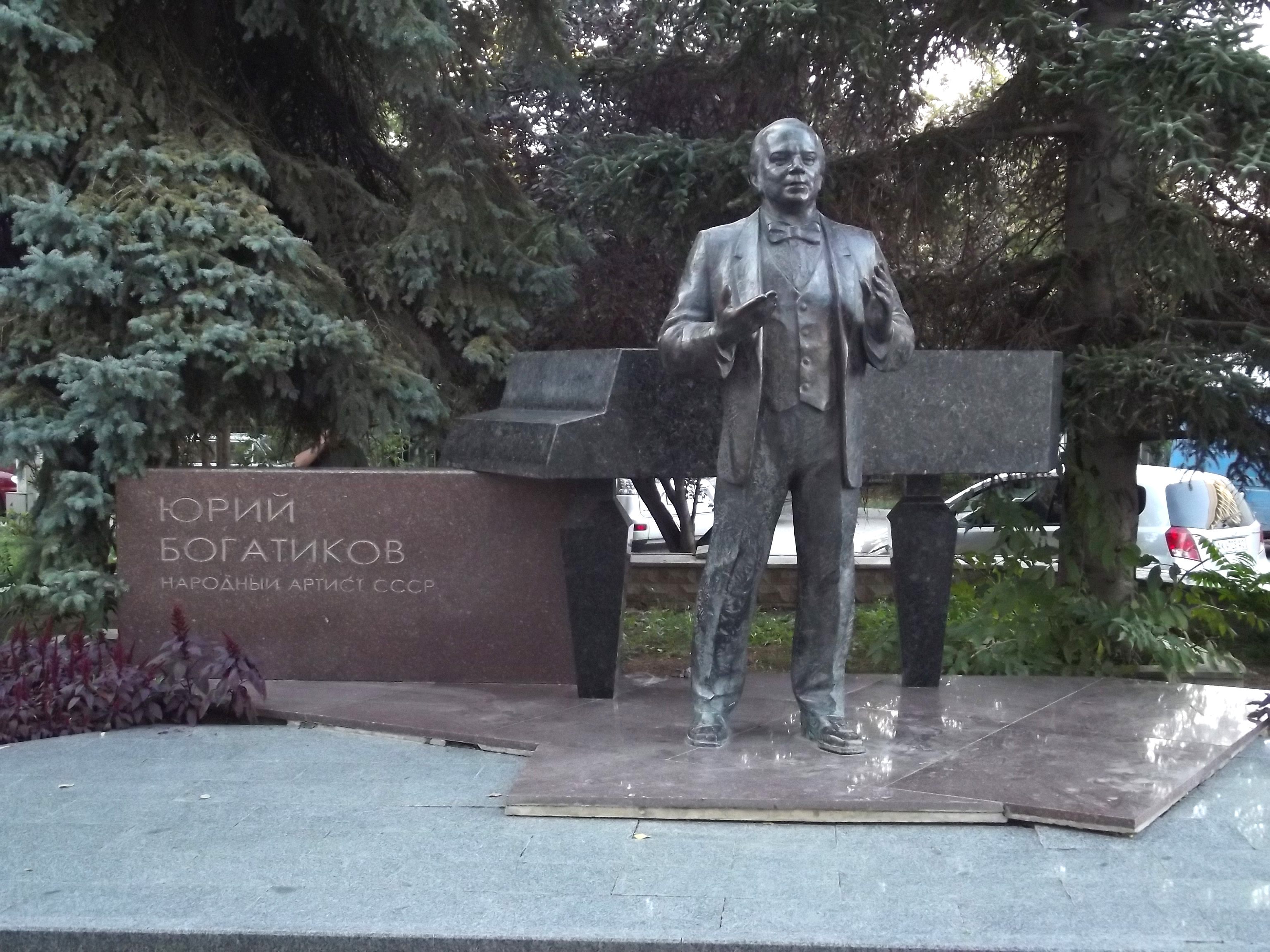
- Monument to Bogatikov in Simferopol

Background information
- Born: 29 February 1932; Rykovo, Ukrainian SSR, Soviet Union
- Died: 8 December 2002 (aged 70) Simferopol, Autonomous Republic of Crimea, Ukraine
- Occupation: Singer

Yuri Iosifovich Bogatikov (Note: Ukrainian: Юрій Йосипович Богатиков, romanized: Yurii Yosypovych Bohatykov; Russian: Юрий Иосифович Богатиков, romanized: Yury Iosifovich Bogatikov) (29 February 1932 – 8 December 2002) was a Soviet and Ukrainian singer (baritone). In 1985 he was honoured with the title of People's Artist of the USSR. His repertoire consisted of over 400 songs. He was the original performer of such songs as "I Haven't Been to Donbass for a Long Time" ("Давно не бывал я в Донбассе" by Bogoslovsky), "Let's Talk" ("Давай, поговорим" by Eduard Khanok), "Don't Let Your Heart Harden, My Son" ("Не остуди своё сердце, сынок" by Migulya), "Remembering the Regimental Band" ("Воспоминание о полковом оркестре" by Gulyaev).
