= Hanna Turchynova =

Former First Lady of Ukraine

- Ганна Турчинова
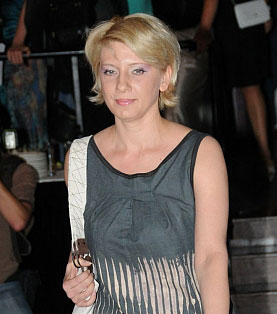
- Turchynova in 2015

First Lady of Ukraine
- Acting; 23 February 2014 – 7 June 2014
- President: Oleksandr Turchynov
- Preceded by: Lyudmyla Yanukovych
- Succeeded by: Maryna Poroshenko

Spouse of the Prime Minister of Ukraine
- Acting; 22 February 2014 – 27 February 2014
- Prime Minister: Oleksandr Turchynov
- Preceded by: Iryna Arbuzova (acting)
- Succeeded by: Tereziya Victorivna
- Acting; 4 March 2010 – 11 March 2010
- Prime Minister: Oleksandr Turchynov
- Preceded by: Oleksandr Tymoshenko
- Succeeded by: Lyudmyla Azarova

Personal details
- Born: Hanna Volodymyrivna Beliba; 1 April 1970 (age 56) Dnipropetrovsk, Ukrainian SSR, Soviet Union
- Spouse: Oleksandr Turchynov
- Children: 1
- Education: Oles Honchar Dnipro National University

Hanna Volodymyrivna Turchynova (Ukrainian: Ганна Володимирівна Турчинова; née Beliba, Ukrainian: Беліба; born 1 April 1970) is a Ukrainian educator who served as acting First Lady of Ukraine from February to June 2014, as the wife of Acting President Oleksandr Turchynov.

Born in Dnipropetrovsk, she holds the degree of Candidate of Sciences and is an associate professor and dean of the Faculty of Natural Geography, Education and Ecology at the National Pedagogical Drahomanov University.

== Early life and education ==
Hanna Volodymyrivna Beliba was born on 1 April 1970 in Dnipropetrovsk (now Dnipro). She graduated from Oles Honchar Dnipro National University and later completed postgraduate studies at Kyiv National Linguistic University.

== Career ==
Since 1995, she has worked as an English instructor at the National Pedagogical Dragomanov University, where she has headed the Department of Foreign Languages since 2006.

== 2016 attempted assassination ==
On 25 May 2016, a man from Russian-occupied Donbas attempted to stab Turchynova, wife of then–National Security and Defense Council chief Oleksandr Turchynov, at her workplace in Kyiv. The attacker, lawyer Volodymyr Olentsevych, was armed with a knife but was subdued by police before any injuries occurred.

According to reports, Olentsevych had mistaken another teacher for Turchynova due to a similar haircut seen in an online photograph. The intended victim's colleague was briefly threatened before a security guard intervened and disarmed the assailant. In 2017, Olentsevych was sentenced to eight and a half years in prison.

== Political views ==
=== Anti-LGBT statements ===
On 15 June 2018, Turchynova stated that there was no discrimination against women in Ukraine and described homosexuality as "a deviation from the norm" and "a disease," calling a heterosexual family "the ideal to strive for." Her remarks, published in a blog post titled "Homo-dictatorship. Part 1. How to Corrupt Children," were widely criticised by human rights organisations and the Ministry of Education and Science of Ukraine. Activists subsequently called on Viktor Andrushchenko, rector of the National Pedagogical Drahomanov University, to dismiss her from her position.

On 25 September 2018, Turchynova claimed that global elites, including George Soros and Bill Gates, were using "gender ideology" to undermine traditional family institutions through the United Nations and European organisations. She characterised gender equality and reproductive rights initiatives as part of a population reduction strategy.

== Personal life ==
Turchynova is married to Oleksandr Turchynov. They have one son, Kyrylo (born 1994), who completed a master's degree in 2014.

Honorary titles
Preceded by Lyudmyla Yanukovych	First Lady of Ukraine; Acting; 2014	Succeeded by Maryna Poroshenko
