= Kateryna Yushchenko =

Former First Lady of Ukraine

- Катерина Ющенко
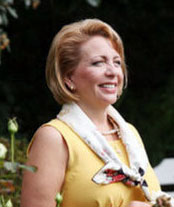
- Yushchenko in 2008

First Lady of Ukraine
- In role 23 January 2005 – 25 February 2010
- President: Viktor Yushchenko
- Preceded by: Lyudmyla Kuchma
- Succeeded by: Lyudmyla Yanukovych

Personal details
- Born: Catherine Claire Chumachenko; September 1, 1961 (age 65) Chicago, Illinois, U.S.
- Spouse: Viktor Yushchenko (m. 1998)
- Children: 3
- Education: Edmund A. Walsh School of Foreign Service; Georgetown University; University of Chicago

Kateryna Mykhaylivna Yushchenko (Note: Ukrainian: Катерина Михайлівна Ющенко, romanized: Kateryna Mykhailivna Yushchenko) (born Catherine Claire Chumachenko, (Note: Ukrainian: Чумаченко, romanized: Chumachenko) September 1, 1961) is an American-born Ukrainian politician and philanthropist who was the First Lady of Ukraine from 2005 to 2010. She is married to President Viktor Yushchenko.

== Family ==
Yushchenko's father, Mykhailo Chumachenko, was born in the village of Zaitsivka, Kharkiv Oblast in 1917 to a large family of farmers. He was one of only a few members of his large family to survive the Soviet Famine of 1932–1933. Chumachenko studied electrical engineering in Lysychansk, Luhansk Oblast. He served in the Soviet Army, and was captured by German forces and taken to Germany in 1942.

Yushchenko's mother, Sofia Chumachenko, was born in Litky, Kyiv Oblast, in 1927, and died 30 September 2012 in Kyiv. Along with many other young women of her village, Sofia Chumachenko was taken to Nazi Germany at the age of 14 to serve as a slave laborer, shortly after the invasion of the Soviet Union.

Kateryna Yushchenko’s parents met in Germany, married, and gave birth to her sister, Lydia, in 1945. Mykhailo Chumachenko became seriously ill with tuberculosis in 1945 and spent eight years in a tuberculosis sanatorium.

In 1956, the Chumachenko family immigrated to the United States on an invitation from the Ukrainian Orthodox Church in Chicago. Mykhailo Chumachenko worked as an electrician in Chicago until his retirement in 1984. The Chumachenkos moved to Florida in 1987. Chumachenko visited his native Ukraine three times, in 1991, 1994 and 1995. His dream was to return to his village and start a small farm. He died in 1998 and is buried in Kyiv.

== Biography ==
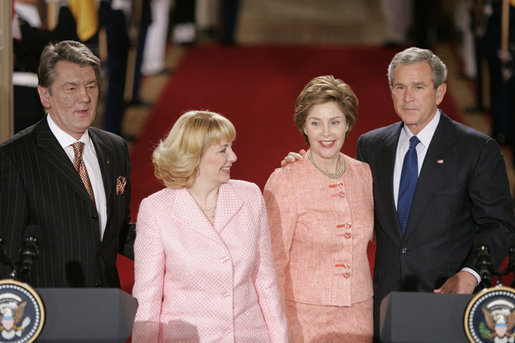
Kateryna Yushchenko with her husband Viktor Yushchenko, George W. Bush and Laura Bush, April 4, 2005 (the East Room of the White House)

Kateryna Yushchenko was born Catherine Claire Chumachenko in Chicago to immigrants from the Left-bank Ukraine. She is a former U.S. State Department official. She worked as a special assistant to the Assistant Secretary of State for Human Rights and Humanitarian Affairs. She holds a bachelor's degree in International Economics from the Edmund A. Walsh School of Foreign Service at Georgetown University (1982), and an MBA from the University of Chicago Graduate School of Business (1986).

She later worked in the White House in the Office of Public Liaison during the administration of Ronald Reagan. Subsequently, she worked at the U.S. Treasury in the executive secretary's office during the administration of George H. W. Bush. After leaving that position, she was on the staff of the Joint Economic Committee of the United States Congress. After Ukraine declared its freedom, she was a co-founder and the vice-president of Ukraine-USA Foundation. She was also the director of Pylyp Orlyk Institute. In 1993, she joined KPMG Peat Marwick/Barents Group as a consultant in its Bank Training Program and Country Manager, where she met Viktor Yushchenko, whom she subsequently married. She left her job in August 2000, when she was expecting her second child.

Yushchenko is now involved in numerous charitable projects with the Ukraine 3000 International Foundation that she chairs. The key priority of the Foundation is better health for Ukraine’s children. On the Supervisory Board of Ukraine 3000 Foundation, established in 2001, are some of Ukraine’s most prominent educational, humanitarian, cultural, literary and sports figures. President Victor Yushchenko served as Chairman of the Supervisory Council until his inauguration in 2005. Since then, its Chairman is Kateryna Yushchenko. All programs and projects of the Foundation are implemented within three major areas: "Ukraine Yesterday", "Ukraine Today" and "Ukraine Tomorrow". The biggest projects of the Foundation are the "Hospital to Hospital" program, the construction and support of the "Children's Hospital of the Future" and "The Joy of Childhood – Free Movements" program.

== Ukrainian politics ==
Opponents of her husband criticized her for remaining a U.S. citizen. During the 2004 Ukrainian presidential election campaign, she was accused of exerting the influence of the U.S. government on her husband's decisions, as an employee of the U.S. government or even a Central Intelligence Agency agent. She had earlier been accused by Russian television journalist Mikhail Leontyev of leading a U.S. project to help Yushchenko seize power in Ukraine; in January 2002, she won a libel case against him. Ukraine's pro-government Inter television channel repeated Leontyev's allegations in 2001, but in January 2003 she won a libel case against the channel as well.

== Personal life ==
She is married to Viktor Yushchenko and has three children: Sofia, Khrystyna, and Taras. She became a Ukrainian citizen in 2005, and in 2007, she renounced her US citizenship.

== Honours ==
- Latvia:
  - Commander Grand Cross of the Order of the Three Stars (19 June 2008)
- Malta:
  - Honorary Member of the Xirka Ġieħ ir-Repubblika (9 July 2008)

== Awards ==
- Special award from Children of Chornobyl Relief and Development Foundation, April 26, 2006
- Golden Pyramid Award, UNESCO, November 2005
- Medal of Prince Vasyl-Kostyantyn Ostrozky from Ostroh Academy, October 2005
- Distinguished Public Service/Public Sector Alumni Award from the University of Chicago Graduate School of Business, October 2005
- Honorary Professor of the Kyiv Mohyla Kollegium Gymnasium, February 2007

== Notes ==
Honorary titles
Preceded by Lyudmyla Kuchma	First Lady of Ukraine; 2005–2010	Succeeded by Lyudmyla Yanukovych
