= Viktor Yanukovych (politician, born 1981) =

Ukrainian politician (1981–2015)

Viktor Yanukovych Jr.
- Виктор Вікторович Янукович
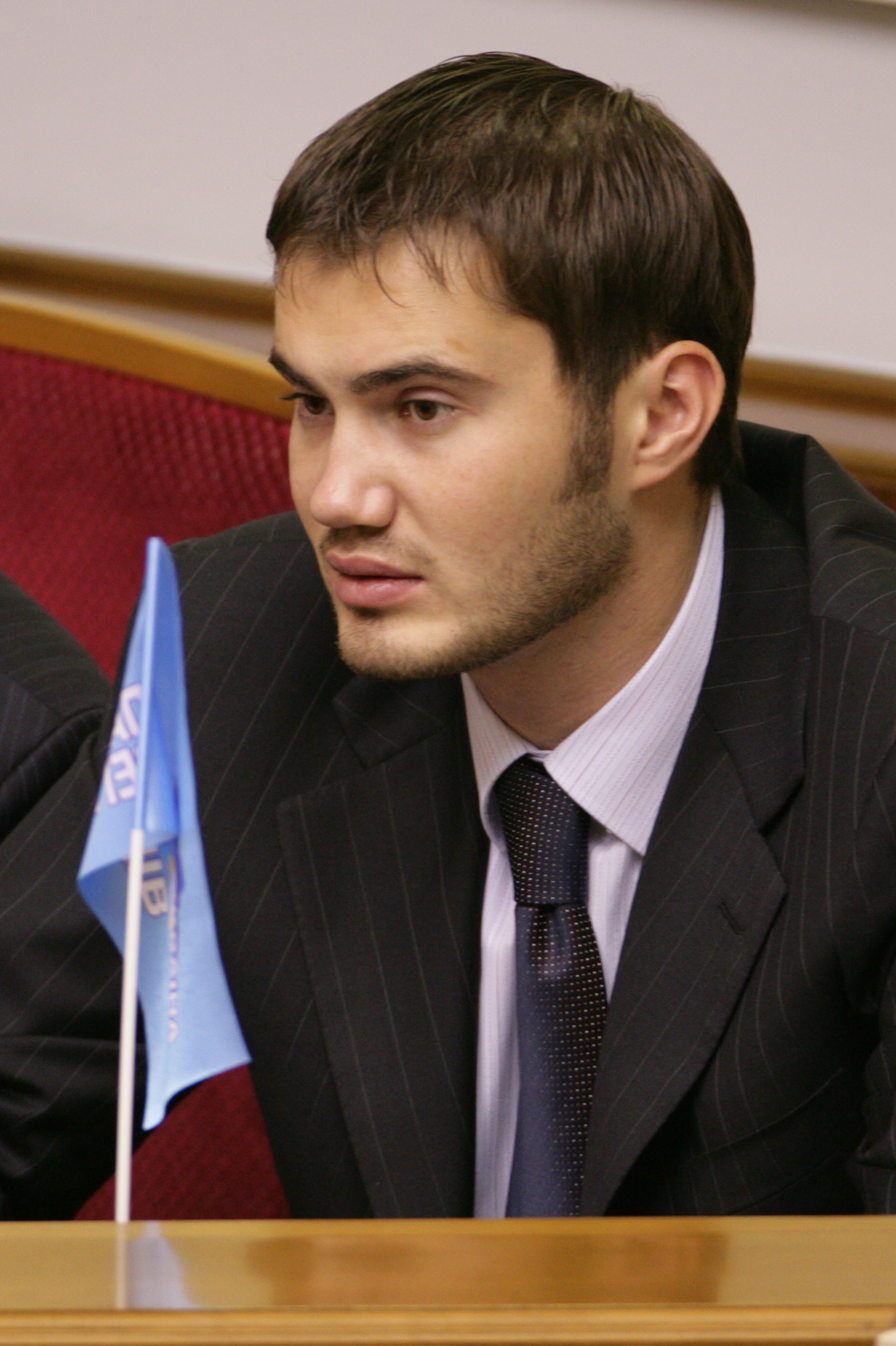

People's Deputy of Ukraine
- In office 25 May 2006 – 27 November 2014

Personal details
- Born: 16 July 1981 Yenakiyevo, Ukrainian SSR, Soviet Union (now Yenakiieve, Donetsk Oblast, Ukraine)
- Died: 20 March 2015 (aged 33) Lake Baikal, Russia
- Party: Party of Regions
- Spouse: Olga Korochanska
- Relations: Oleksandr Yanukovych (brother)
- Children: Iliya Viktorovich Yanukovych
- Parents: Viktor Yanukovych (father); Lyudmyla Yanukovych (mother)
- Education: Donetsk National University
- Occupation: Politician

Viktor Viktorovych Yanukovych (Ukrainian: Віктор Вікторович Янукович, Russian: Виктор Викторович Янукович, romanized: Viktor Viktorovich Yanukovich, Belarusian: Віктар Віктаравіч Януковіч, romanized: Viktar Viktaravich Yanukovich; 16 July 1981 – 20 March 2015) was a Ukrainian politician and Member of Parliament. He was the son of former Ukrainian President Viktor Yanukovych.

== Early life and education ==
Yanukovych was born on 16 July 1981 in Yenakiieve, Donetsk region, to Viktor Yanukovych and Lyudmyla Yanukovych. He had one brother named Oleksandr Yanukovych.

In 1998, Yanukovych graduated from high school with a silver medal. He went on to study "Enterprise Economy" at Donetsk National University from 1998 to 2003. He graduated with a master's degree in the same field. In 2009, he defended his dissertation titled “Formation and Implementation of State Social Policy” at Donetsk State University of Management, and earned a PhD in public administration.

== Activity ==
From June 2002 to September 2004, Yanukovych served as vice-president of the Donetsk regional public organization Regional Center Spryiannia. From July 2004 to November 2004, he was the first deputy general director of SK, a limited liability company in Donetsk. In November 2005, he became the first deputy general director of BK Engineering, and also worked as deputy head of the Ukrainian youth public organization "Soyuz molodi regioniv Ukrainy" (Union of Ukrainian Youth of Regions) until 2010. He has been an MP for the Party of Regions in the V, VI and VII parliamentary sessions. In 2010, he became the Honorary President of the Union of Ukrainian Youth of Regions.

During the 2012 Ukrainian parliamentary election, he was re-elected into parliament.

== Parliamentary activities ==
Yanukovych was the initiator and project manager of the Ukrainian SMS referendum "For the Russian language." The referendum ran from 17 January to 17 March 2006, was a public opinion poll on the question of granting Russian as the second official language. The SMS referendum was recognised by Book of Records Ukraine for "The most massive online poll in Ukraine" and "the most massive SMS poll in Ukraine."

In 2011, the Ukrainian Parliament adopted a bill on an experiment in information technology, co-authored by Viktor Yanukovych. According to this bill, domestic IT companies would be granted a "tax holiday" for 5 years.

Viktor Yanukovych supported the policy of state patronage of the Ukrainian film industry. This policy provides protection and promotion of national films on both domestic and international markets through tax incentives, financial, and legal support. As a result, an amendment to the Tax Code of Ukraine came into effect on 1 January 2011. The new law states that VAT exemptions until 2016 will apply to all operations connected with the supply of national films, as determined by the Law of Ukraine "On Cinematography". This covers all manufacturers, distributors and demonstrators, as well as suppliers of services for production, including replication of national and foreign films, duplicated, voiced, or subtitled in the official language in the territory of Ukraine.

In 2011, the Ukrainian film budget reached a record amount of UAH 111 million, compared to UAH 24 million in 2010. Due to the efforts of Viktor Yanukovych, the State Budget for 2012 was adopted with record funding for the national cinema—UAH 176 million, which is one third higher than the budget of 2011. In 2011, transparent competitions for the funding of locally produced short films were conducted. In 2012, 37 films were selected for production, nine of which were debuts. Thirty projects have already been funded.

In 2011, Yanukovych introduced a certification for highway dividers in Ukraine. The Deputy's proposal on this initiative was sent to the state motorway agency. The first result of the work in this direction has been nationwide monitoring of the old highway dividers on Ukrainian roads.

== Death ==
Yanukovych died on the evening of 20 March 2015 when he fell through the ice while driving his minivan on Lake Baikal. Yanukovych had driven his vehicle out on the ice near Khoboi Cape on the northern edge of Olkhon Island. Five of the passengers escaped, but Yanukovych was unable to unfasten his seat belt in time and he drowned. The Ministry of Emergencies in Irkutsk Oblast announced on BBC Ukraine that the driver's name was Viktor Davydov (Davydov was the maiden surname of Viktor's mother), but Nestor Shufrych confirmed that the deceased was a son of the former president, Viktor Yanukovych. He was buried in a Russian military cemetery at Sevastopol in Crimea. Russian authorities refused to comment on reports of Yanukovych's death and did not respond to a Ukrainian Foreign Ministry query about it. A report about the accident that killed Yanukovych was removed from the Russian Ministry of Emergencies website shortly after it was posted.
