= Yenakiieve Iron and Steel Works =

Ukrainian steel company

Yenakiieve Metallurgical Factory

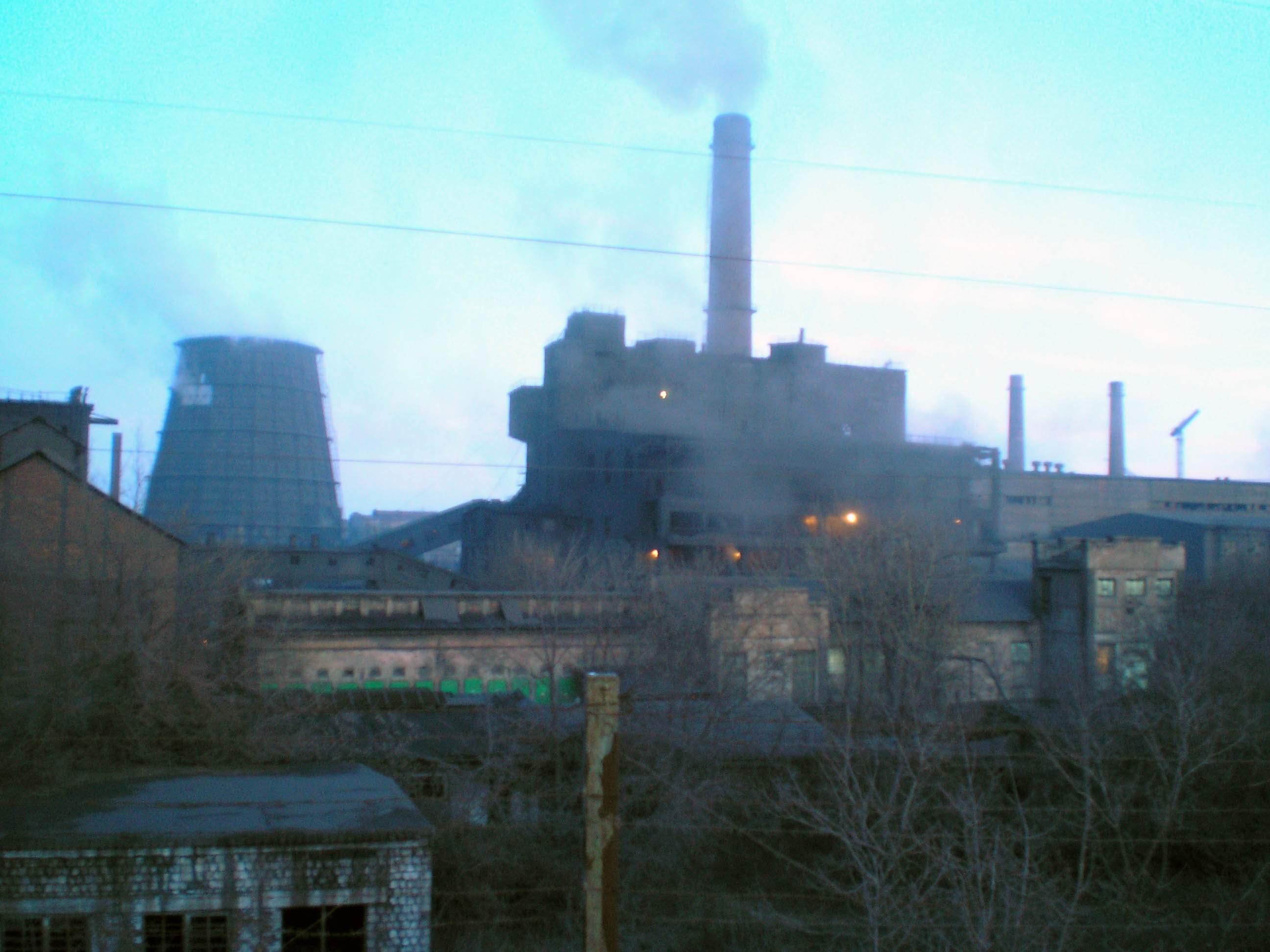
- Type: Public (subsidiary of YUGMK)
- Traded as: PFTS: ENMZ
- Industry: steel production
- Predecessor: Peter's Factory
- Founded: February 2, 1895
- Founder: Fedir Yenakiiev
- Headquarters: Yenakiieve, Ukraine
- Key people: Valery Sherin (CEO)
- Owner: Russian-Belgium Metallurgical Association (1895–1917); Soviet government (1917–1991); Ukrainian government (1991-1993); Metinvest (1993-2017); YUGMK (2021-present)
- Number of employees: 4500 (2024)
- Parent: Southern Mining and Metallurgical Complex LLC (YUGMK)
- Divisions: Makeevka Metallurgical Plant named after S. M. Kirov
- Website: emz.metinvestholding.com/en

Yenakiieve Iron and Steel Works, Public Joint Stock Company (PJSC) (Ukrainian: Єнакієвський металургійний завод; Russian: Енакиевский металлургический завод; EMZ) is an integrated steelmaking enterprise comprising OJSC Yenakiieve Iron and Steel Works and JV Metalen LLC. Yenakiieve Iron and Steel Works (Yenakiieve Steel) is a major employer of the city Yenakiieve in Donetsk Oblast of Ukraine. The works is located in the vicinity of the railway station Yenakiieve and is 60 km from Donetsk.

A trade blockade by Ukrainian activists during the War in Donbas has all but halted production since February 2017. On 1 March 2017 the separatist Donetsk People's Republic “nationalized” (along with all Ukrainian enterprises located in territory it controlled) the company. The Commercial Court of Donetsk Oblast declared the enterprise bankrupt in July 2019. Since June 2021, the UGMK group (Southern Mining and Metallurgical Complex) has taken over the management of the metallurgical enterprise EMK. In 2024, after a major overhaul, blast furnace No. 5 was reopened and put into operation. It will be able to smelt more than 1 million tons of iron per year.

== History ==
The enterprise has more than 100 years' working experience.

November 1897 - The first blast furnace was blown and first cast iron produced. This date is considered to be the date when Petrovskiy (Yenakiievskiy) steel works was established. Another blast furnace, Bessemer, and rail rolling shops were introduced in December.

1898 - The surrounding area was named Yenakiieve after the name of engineer Fedir Yenakiev.

1914 - A total of 6 blast furnaces and 7 open-hearth furnace, 2 converters, 8 rolling mills were operating at the steel works.

1931 - First domestic casting machine was introduced.

1938 - First sintering plant was launched

1968 - The steel works received the Order of the Red Banner of Labour.

== Production ==
Key types of products producing at Yenakiyeve Steel:

- hot metal and pig iron;
- steel in ingots;
- concast square billets;
- shapes and rolled section

Yenakiyeve Iron and Steel Works was one of the world’s leading square billet producers.

=== By year ===
- The volume of rolled metal production in 2011 amounted to 2.176 million tons.
- Rolled metal production in 2019 amounted to 1,446 thousand tons.
- Rolled metal production in 2020 amounted to 677 thousand tons.

== See also ==
- FC Pivdenstal Yenakiieve
