= Oleksandr Yanukovych =

Ukrainian businessman

- Олександр Янукович
- Born: 10 July 1973 (age 53); Donetsk, Ukrainian SSR, Soviet Union (present-day Ukraine)
- Occupation: Businessman
- Children: 2
- Parents: Viktor Yanukovych (father); Lyudmyla Yanukovych (mother)
- Relatives: Viktor Viktorovych Yanukovych (brother)

Oleksandr Viktorovych Yanukovych (Ukrainian: Олександр Вікторович Янукович; born July 10, 1973, in Donetsk) is a Russian businessman and son of the former President of Ukraine Viktor Yanukovych. He became one of the richest men in the country during his father's time in office, leading a group known as "the family" and a conglomerate called Management Assets Company (MAKO). Since the ouster as President of his father he has lived in Russia and has there been granted Russian citizenship.

== Early life and education ==
Yanukovych was born on 10 July 1973 to Viktor Yanukovych and Lyudmyla Yanukovych. In March 2015, Yanukovych's younger brother Viktor Viktorovych Yanukovych was reported to have died after a vehicle he was travelling fell through ice in Siberia. News reports at the time highlighted several similar deaths of people with ties to Yanukovych's father.

Yanukovych graduated from the Donetsk National University as a dentist.

== MAKO ==
Since 2006 he has led and been majority shareholder of Management Assets Company (MAKO), which grew rapidly starting in 2010, the year Yanuovych's father became president. MAKO owns construction companies that have built business centres and shopping malls in Donetsk, a hotel in Balaklava and some banks, and has also been involved in banking and coal exportation. In 2011, MAKO consisted of 16 enterprises in Ukraine, Switzerland and the Netherlands, and employed 700 people. MAKO was assessed by the auditor PricewaterhouseCoopers as having $212 million in assets in 2011, grossing $663,000 from sales. In March 2012 Yanukovych's net worth was estimated to be at least $130 million by Kyiv Post. Before 2013 MAKO had denied it had bid for government public procurement contracts, taken part in government privatizations of state assets, or been involved in the extraction of natural resources. In November 2012 Forbes Ukraine reported that companies linked to Oleksandr Yanukovych had at no cost taken over majority stakes worth an estimated $10 million in five coal enrichment plants from the state. This was denied by Yanukovych. In February 2013, Forbes Ukraine stated that Oleksandr Yanukovych had earned more in Ukrainian public procurement contracts than any other businessperson since the beginning of 2012. Forbes Ukraine reported in February 2014 that in January 2014, his businesses won 50% of all state tenders.

In early 2014, his personal assets were reported to be over $500 million.

== Ukrainian Bank of Development ==
The Ukrainian Bank of Development (UBD) was founded in 1995 and controlled by Valentyna Arbuzova. Reports allege that in 2011, Yanukovych purchased stock in the bank to achieve 100% ownership.

In 2014, investigations by anti-corruption organizations into the bank and potential bribery charges against Yanukovych were launched. These included an order to freeze Swiss assets of both Yanukovych and former acting prime minister Serhiy Arbuzov, son of the UBD president.

In 2017, a Kyiv court rejected a lawsuit by Yanukovych to recover up to ₴1.6 billion in damages from the National Bank of Ukraine after it delisted the UBD following sanctions applied by the European Union.

== Corruption allegations ==
Ukrainian press have noted that people close to Yanukovych landed some of Ukraine's most important positions, including top government positions, during his father's presidency, although his father denied that he appointed individuals based on their personal loyalty and closeness to his family rather than qualifications. Also, Yanukovych's organization was accused of performing over 70 "raid seizures", where, with the help of corrupt government officials, the organization seized a property (usually a small business) under a fabricated justification.

In 2016, Yanukovych and his father sought the annulment of their assets in sanction measures adopted by the EU in 2014, stating that the evidence presented was not factual. In 2015, Viktor Yanukovych was placed on Interpol's Wanted List. Ukrainian Interior Minister Arsen Avakov confirmed that a warrant was also issued for Oleksandr Yanukovych. In 2017, however, Interpol removed all data on the pair, and confirmed that Oleksandr was not on the wanted list.

In 2017, Swiss authorities confirmed that Oleksandr Yanukovych did not have any personal bank accounts or assets in Switzerland, apart from those owned by MAKO Trading SA. In October, the European Court of Justice upheld sanctions against Yanukovych and his father.

== Personal life ==
Yanukovych is married and has two sons.

According to documents published by RIA Novosti, Yanukovych has received Russian citizenship.
