= Donbas National Academy of Civil Engineering and Architecture =

Engineering college in Makiyivka, Ukraine

Coordinates: 48.74912°N 37.59407°E

- Донбаська національна академія будівництва і архітектури Donbasʹka natsionalʹna akademiya budivnytstva i arkhitektury
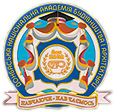
- Motto: Навчаючи – навчаємось
- Motto in English: Teaching – Learning
- Type: Engineering college
- Affiliations: Ministry of Education and Science of Ukraine
- Rector: Vasyl Kravets
- Students: 8,000+
- Location: Ivano-Frankivsk, Ivano-Frankivsk Oblast, Ukraine
- Website: donnaba.edu.ua

The Donbas National Academy of Civil Engineering and Architecture (abbr. DonNABA, Ukrainian: Донбаська національна академія будівництва і архітектури, ДонНАБА, romanized: Donbaska natsionalna akademiia budivnytstva i arkhitektury, DonNABA) was one of the largest state-sponsored engineering universities in Ukraine. It was founded on 1 January 1972 as the Makiivka Civil Engineering Institute.

== Background ==
The Academy has been training engineers for over sixty years. Its history starts in 1947 with the establishment of the civil engineering department of the Donetsk Polytechnic Institute. It was established as an independent institution in 1972. It was renamed on 23 June 1993 as the Donbas Institute of Civil Engineering. In 1994, the institution was awarded the status of Academy, and renamed Donbas State Academy of Civil Engineering and Architecture.

Donbas National Academy of Civil Engineering and Architecture is the only educational institution in Donetsk and Luhansk oblasts, together known as the Donbas, that trains architects, urban development specialists, and civil engineers. The academy has trained more than 25,000 engineers and architects, including over 500 foreigners. The academy teaches more than 8,000 students from Ukraine, the Commonwealth of Independent States, Africa, the Middle East, and Asia. There are 436 teachers at the academy. Starting in 1997, the Academy worked toward European integration, as part of the Bologna Process. The Academy is accredited by the Britain-based Institution of Civil Engineers (ICE), only such institution in Ukraine. The rector of the Academy, Professor Yevhen Horokhov, is the only specialist in Ukraine that has attained the highest level of professional certification with the ICE.

In 2014, due to the war in Donbas, the university moved its offices from Russian-occupied Makiivka to Kramatorsk, establishing a campus on the basis of the Donbas State Engineering Academy.

Following Russia's full-scale invasion of Ukraine in 2022, the university moved to Ivano-Frankivsk in western Ukraine. In 2024, it was merged into the Ivano-Frankivsk National Technical University of Oil and Gas.

== See also ==
List of universities in Ukraine
