= Bunge =

Bunge may refer to:

- Bunge (surname)
- Bunge Land, one of the New Siberian Islands
- Bunge y Born, an agribusiness company, now known as Bunge Limited
- Bunge Limited, an agribusiness company
- The unicameral National Assembly in the Tanzanian legislature
- A modifiable avatar stat in GunBound
- Bunge, Gotland, a settlement on Gotland island, Sweden
- The Russian name of Bunhe, Ukraine (derived from the surname)

== See also ==
- Bung (disambiguation)
- Bungee (disambiguation)
