= Bunji =

Bunji or Bunji-ye may refer to:

== Places ==
- Bunji-ye Karbasi, a village in Hormozgan Province, Iran
- Bunji-ye Maski, a village in Hormozgan Province, Iran
- Bunji-ye Saheli Latidan, a village in Hormozgan Province, Iran
- Bunji, Pakistan, a town in Gilgit-Baltistan, Pakistan

== Other uses ==
- Bunji (era), Japan
- Bunji (given name)

== See also ==
- Bungi (disambiguation)
