= Donbas =

Region in eastern Ukraine

Donbas: Донбасс (Russian); Донбас (Ukrainian)
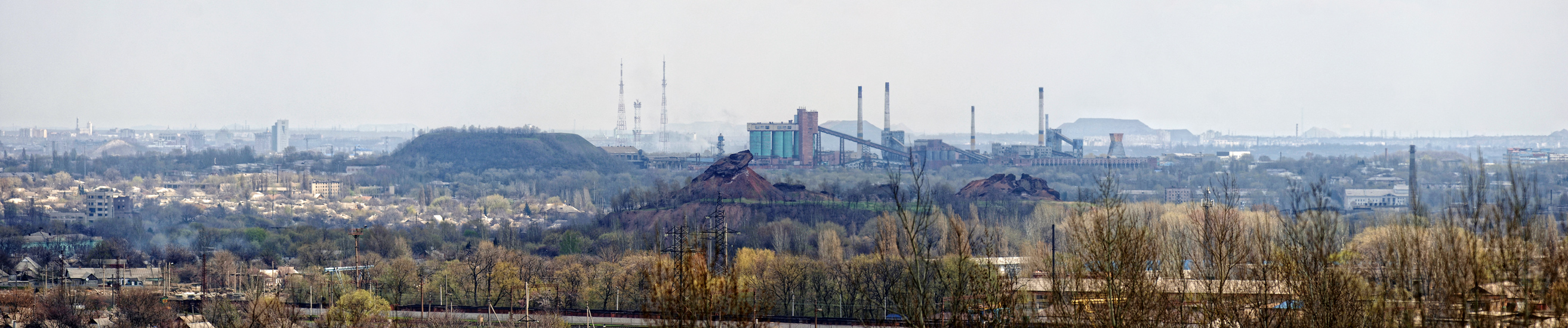
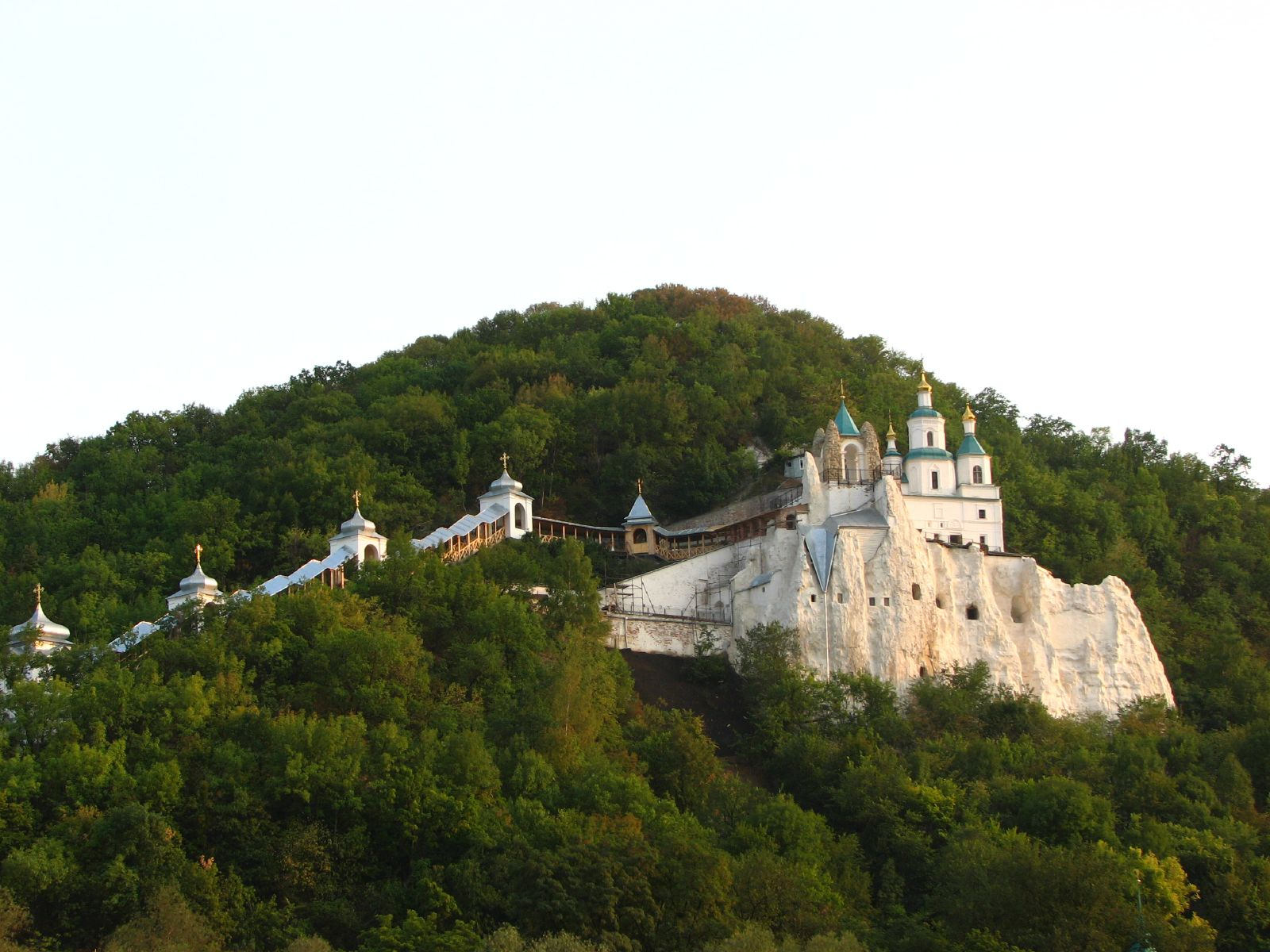
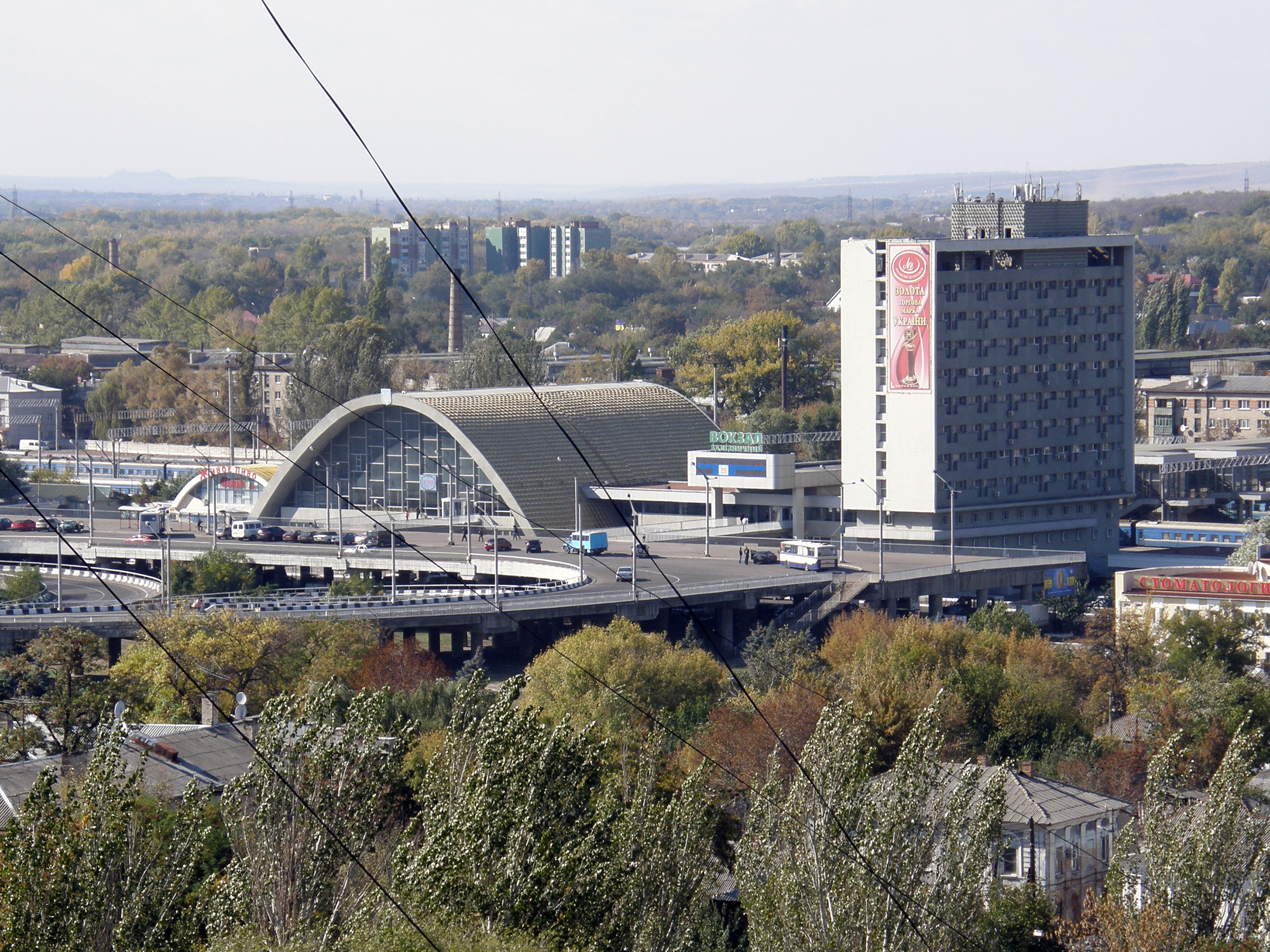
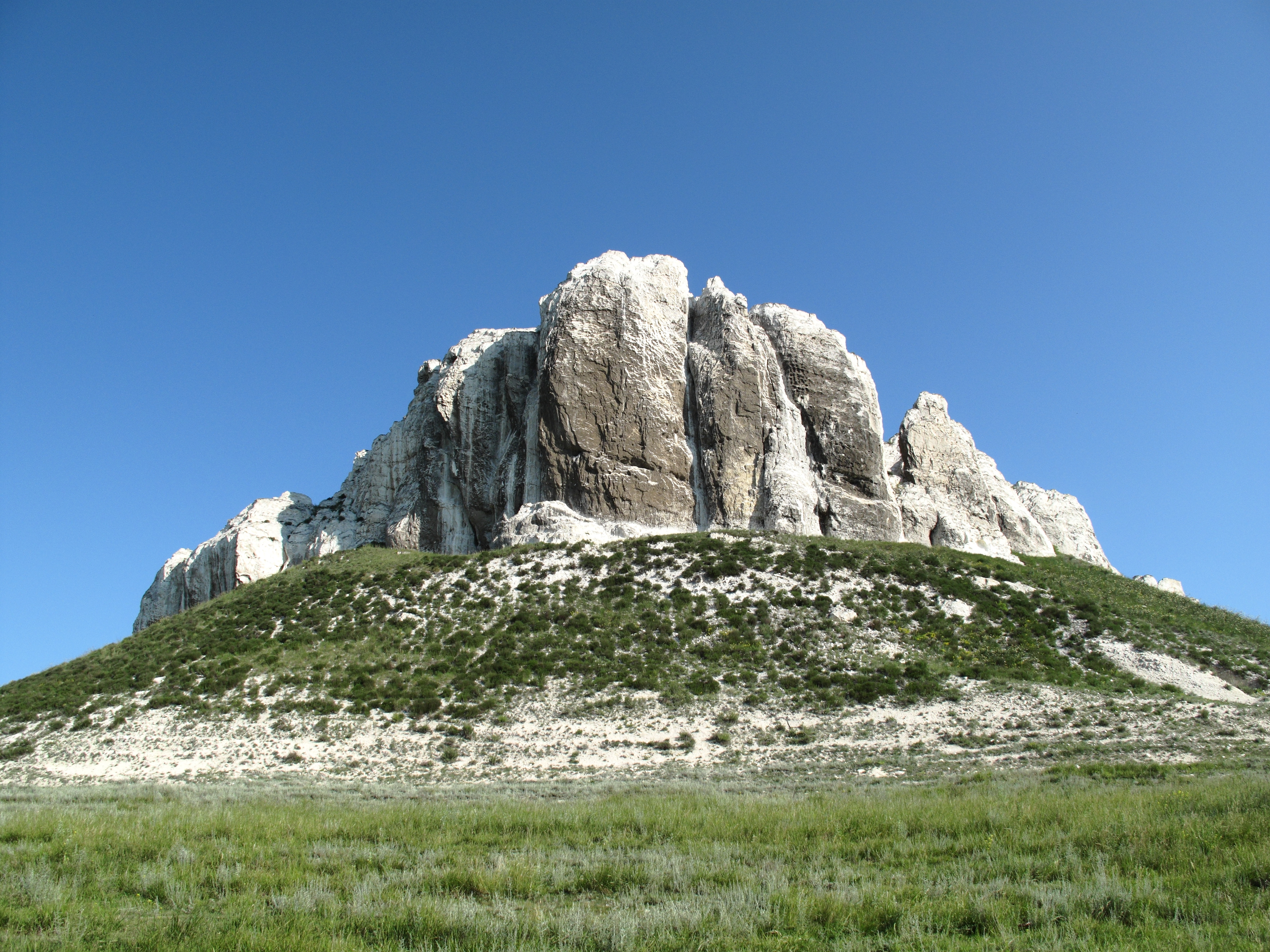
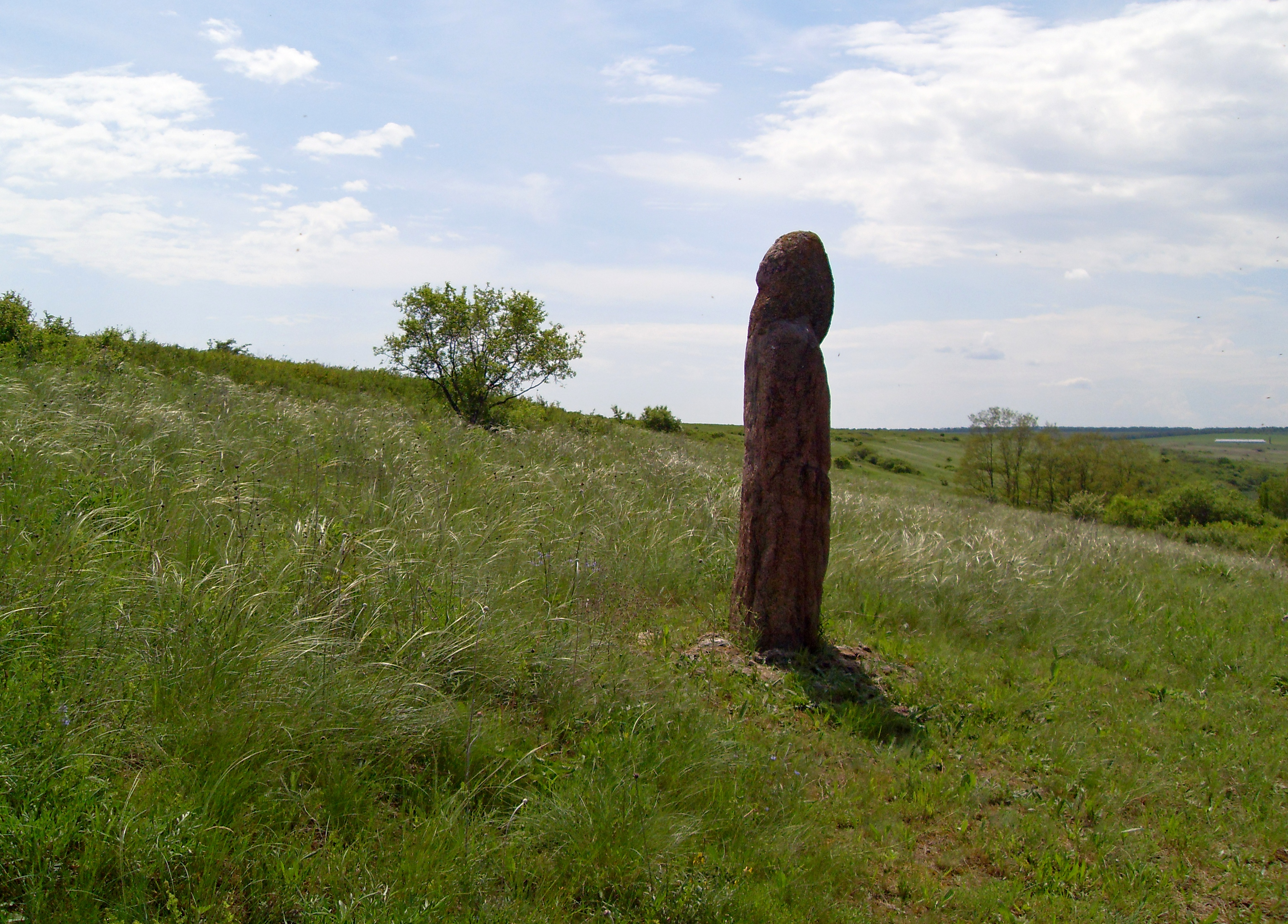
- Panorama of Donetsk; Sviatohirsk Monastery; Luhansk railway station; Chalk outcrop near Kramatorsk; Kurgan stele in the steppe

- Location of Donbas (here understood as the Donetsk and Luhansk oblasts) within Ukraine
- Country: Ukraine (Note: Most of Donbas is under Russian occupation. Russia considers Donetsk and Luhansk regions as its administrative divisions since 2022.) and Russia (Note: Most definitions of the Donbas include portions of Rostov Oblast)
- Largest city: Donetsk

Area
  - Total: 53,201 km^{2} (20,541 sq mi)

Population (2010)
  - Total: 6,651,378
  - Density: 125/km^{2} (320/sq mi)

GDP
  - Total: ₴ 220 billion (US$27 billion)
  - Per capita: ₴ 33,000 (US$4,000)

The Donbas (UK: /dɒnˈbɑːs/, US: /ˈdɒnbɑːs, dʌnˈbæs/; Ukrainian: Донбас [donˈbɑs]) or Donbass (Russian: Донбасс [dɐnˈbas]) is a historical, cultural, and economic region on the Russia–Ukraine border, lying predominantly in Ukraine. The vast majority of the Donbas is occupied by Russia as a result of the Russo-Ukrainian war, as the Russian Armed Forces controlled about 90% of the region as of October 2025. At the last census in 2001, the population of the Donbas region of Ukraine was about 58% ethnic Ukrainian and 38% ethnic Russian.

There are several definitions of the region's extent. In modern geopolitics, the Donbas usually refers to Donetsk Oblast and Luhansk Oblast in Ukraine. The Encyclopedia of History of Ukraine defines the "small Donbas" as the northern part of Donetsk and the southern part of Luhansk oblasts in Ukraine, and the attached part of Rostov Oblast in Russia. The historical coal mining region excluded parts of Donetsk and Luhansk oblasts, but included areas in Dnipropetrovsk Oblast and Southern Russia. The Euroregion of Donbas is composed of Donetsk and Luhansk oblasts in Ukraine and Rostov Oblast in Russia.

The Donbas formed the historical border between the Zaporozhian Sich and the Don Cossack Host. It has been an important coal mining area since the late 19th century, when it became a heavily industrialised territory. The word Donbas is a portmanteau formed from "Donets Basin", an abbreviation of "Donets Coal Basin" (Ukrainian: Донецький вугільний басейн, romanized: Donetskyi vuhilnyi basein; Russian: Донецкий угольный бассейн, romanized: Donetskiy ugolnyy basseyn). The name of the coal basin is a reference to the Donets river and the Donets Ridge. The city of Donetsk (the fifth largest city in Ukraine) is considered the unofficial capital of the Donbas. Other large cities (over 100,000 inhabitants) include Mariupol, Luhansk, Makiivka, Horlivka, Kramatorsk, Sloviansk, Alchevsk, Sievierodonetsk, and Lysychansk.

In March 2014, following the Euromaidan protest movement and the resulting Revolution of Dignity, large swaths of the Donbas became gripped by pro-Russian and anti-government unrest. This unrest later grew into a war between Ukrainian government forces and pro-Russian separatists affiliated with the self-proclaimed Donetsk and Luhansk "People's Republics", who were supported by Russia as part of the broader Russo-Ukrainian war. The conflict split the Donbas into Ukrainian-held territory, constituting about two-thirds of the region, and separatist-held territory, constituting about one-third. The region remained this way for years until Russia launched a full-scale invasion of Ukraine in 2022. On 30 September 2022, Russia unilaterally declared its annexation of Donbas together with two other Ukrainian oblasts, Kherson and Zaporizhzhia.

== Geography ==
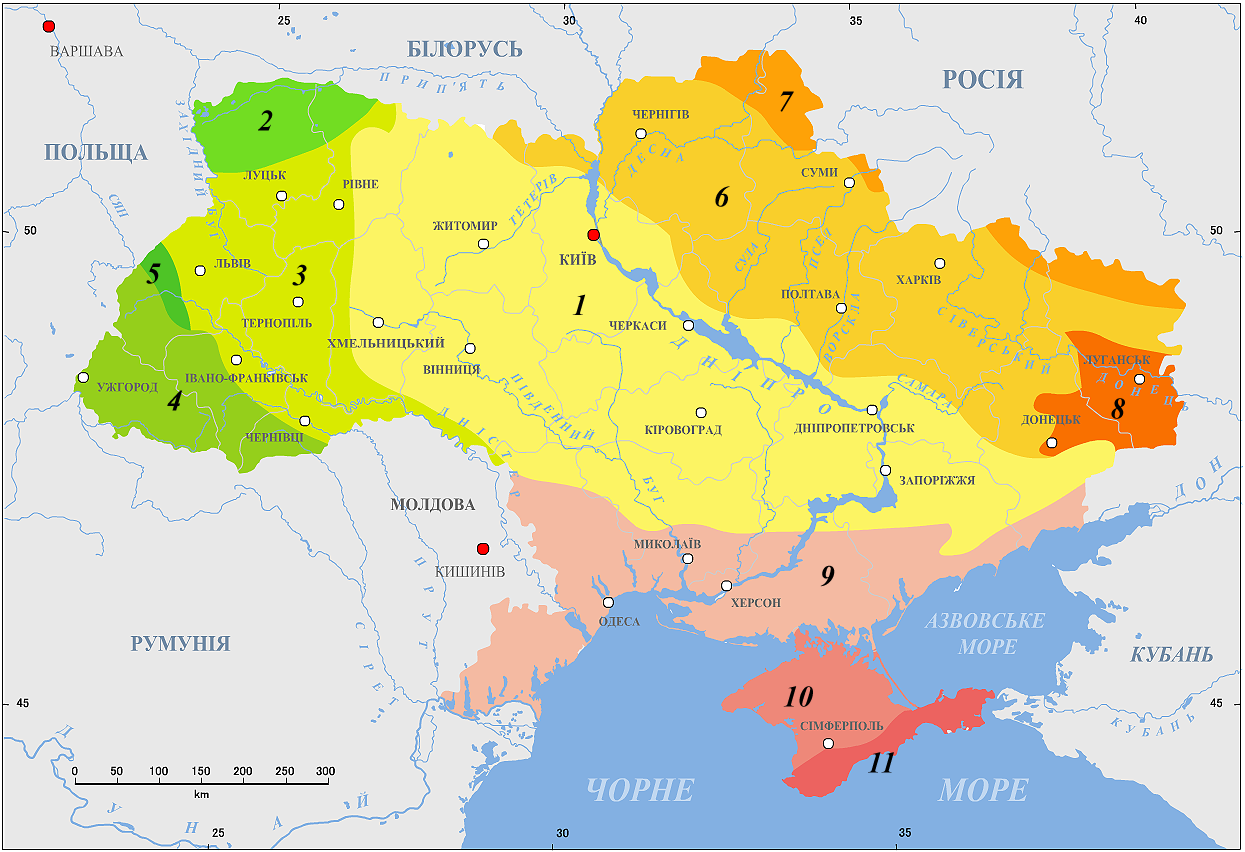
Geology of Ukraine (8) = Donets fold belt

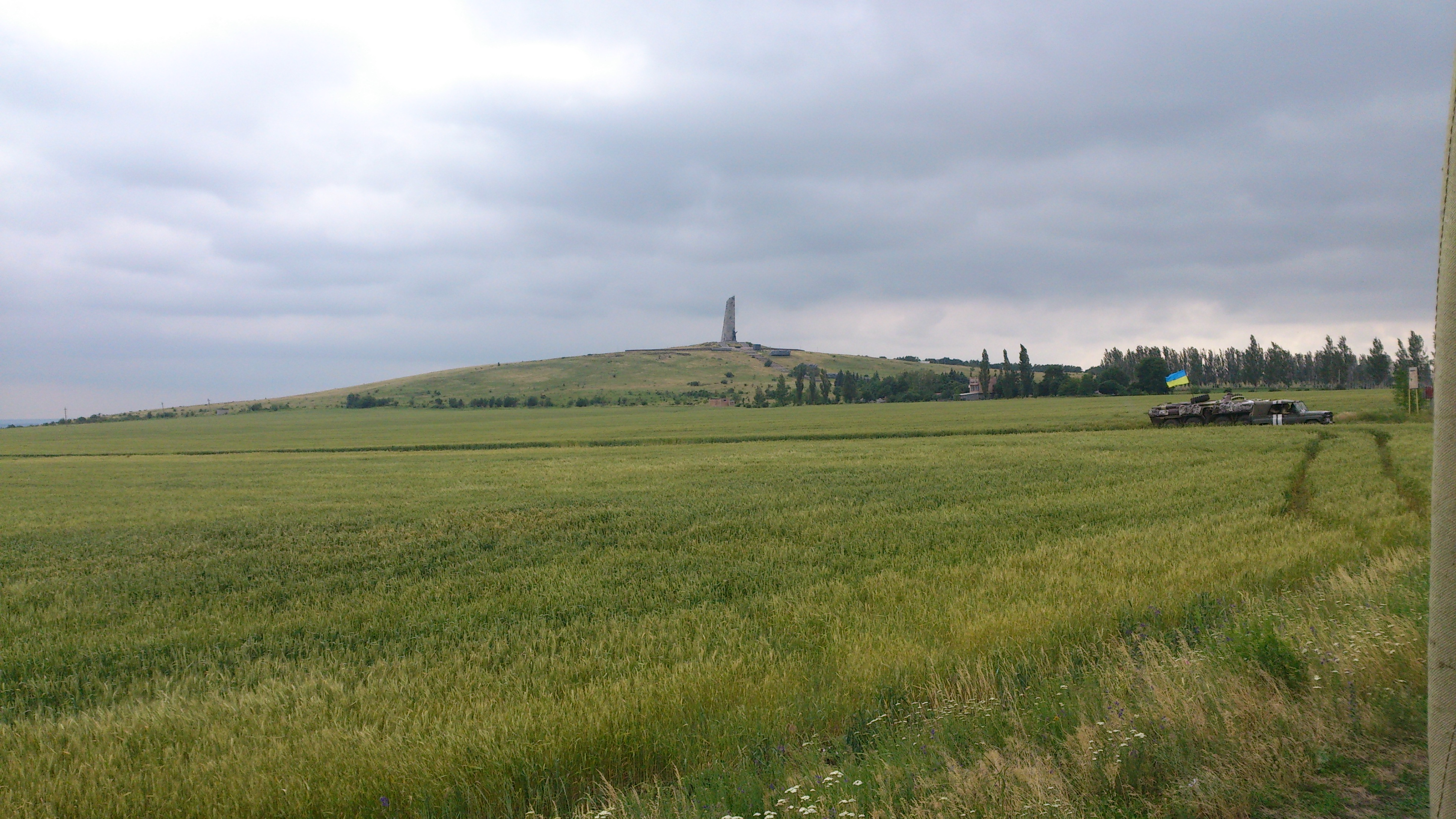
Savur-Mohyla

Donbas is located in the southeastern part of Ukraine, between the middle and lower flow of the river Donets in the north and Azov Upland and Lowland in the south. Total area of the region is approximately 23,000 sq km. It approximately corresponds to the territory of Donets Ridge, where coal layers emerge from the earth surface. This central area of Donbas proper is also known as "Old Donbas". To the west, north, east and southeast from the "Old Donbas", coal deposits are located at a depth of 500-600 meters and more; those regions, known as "New Donbas", emerged as coal producing regions only after World War II. In the west, the area of coal production extends up to the city of Samar in Dnipropetrovsk Oblast, and is known as Western Donbas. In the north, coal layers extend towards Kharkiv, and in the east towards Volgograd, covering parts of Russia. The total territory of "Old" and "New Donbas" comprises around 50,000 sq km.

The area of Donbas is located on a steppe upland reaching the height of 367 meters above sea level and divided by numerous valleys with depths up to 100 meters. The central part of the area formed during the Carboniferous period, but in peripherial regions Permian, Triassic, Jurassic and Cretaceous sediments are also present. Due to a larger amount of rainfall as compared to surrounding areas, Donbas represents a forest steppe ecosystem. The landscape of the area has experienced serious changes as a result of human activities: already during ancient times, the steppe was covered with numerous graves (kurgans), and in modern days the region is characterized with numerous factories, coal mines, slag heaps, settlements, high voltage lines, railways, highways and tram lines. Many rivers have dams and canals built on them, and subsidence as a result of mining has led to the emergence of new water bodies. Most of the area outside of cities is cultivated, with most of the original forests being replaced with artificial windbreaks and parks.

== History ==
=== Ancient, medieval and early modern period ===
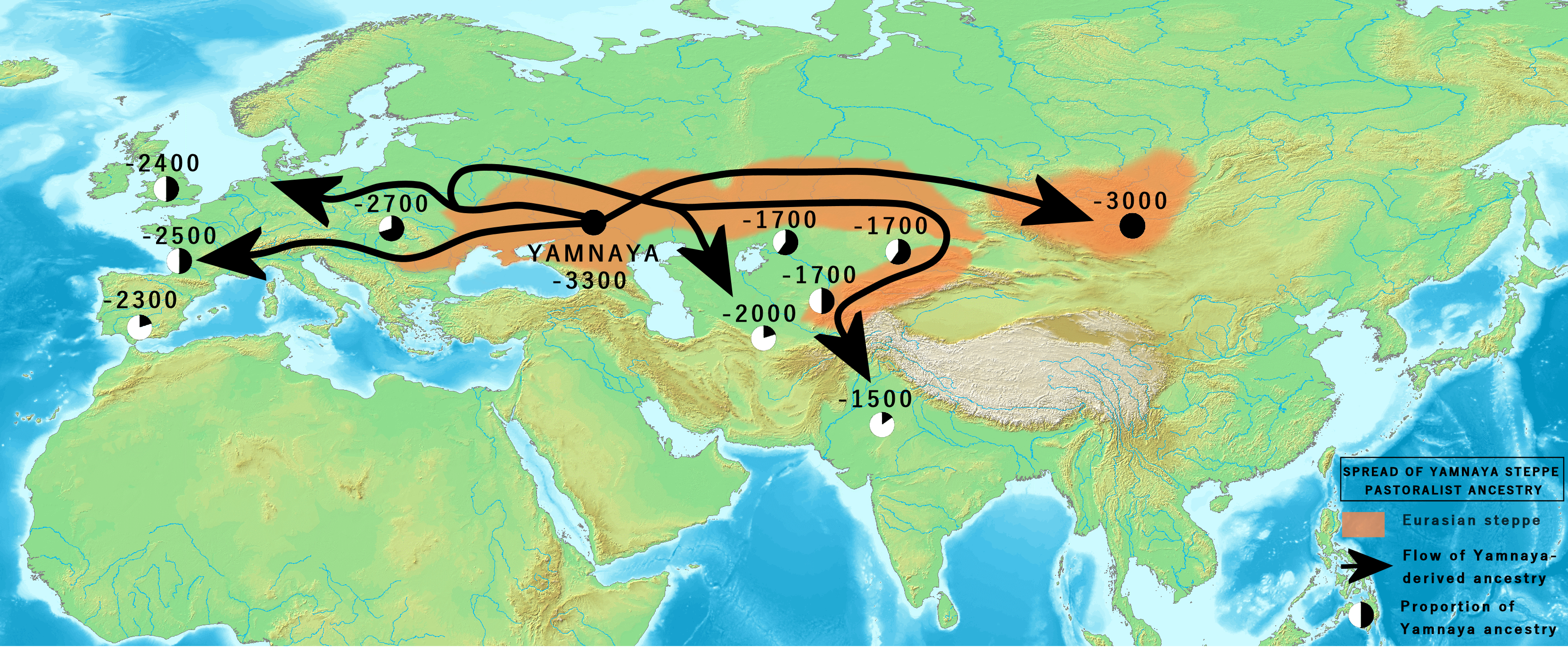
Bronze Age spread of Yamnaya Steppe pastoralist ancestry

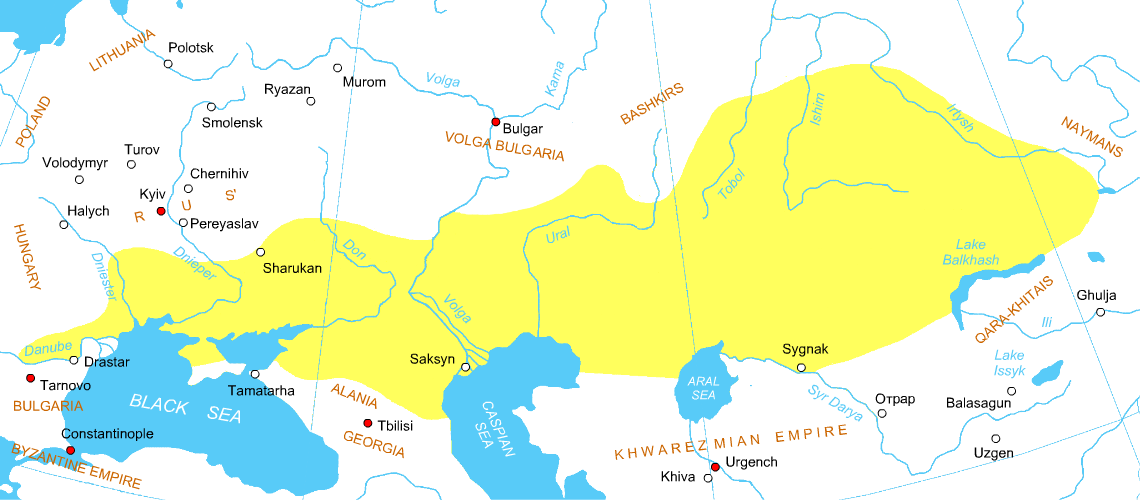
A map of the Cuman–Kipchak confederation in Eurasia, c. 1200

The Kurgan hypothesis places the Pontic steppes of Ukraine and southern Russia as the linguistic homeland of the Proto-Indo-Europeans. The Yamnaya culture is identified with the late Proto-Indo-Europeans.

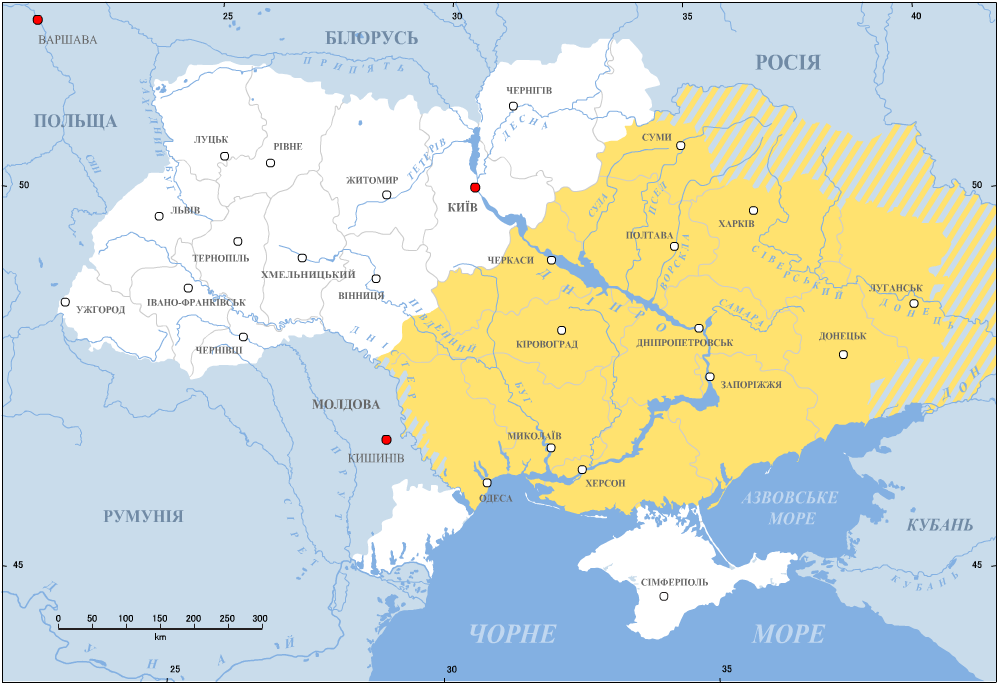
A map of the sparsely populated Wild Fields in the 17th century

The region has been inhabited for centuries by various nomadic tribes, such as Scythians, Alans, Huns, Bulgars, Pechenegs, Kipchaks, Turco-Mongols, Tatars and Nogais. During the Rus' period, lands along the Donets river in the northern part of modern Donbas fell under the influence of the Principality of Pereyaslav. The region now known as the Donbas was largely unpopulated until the second half of the 17th century, when Don Cossacks established the first permanent settlements in the region.

The first town in the region was founded in 1676, called Solanoye (now Soledar), which was built for the profitable business of exploiting newly discovered rock-salt reserves. Known for being a Cossack land, the "Wild Fields" (Ukrainian: дике поле, dyke pole), the area that is now called the Donbas was largely under the control of the Ukrainian Cossack Hetmanate and the Turkic Crimean Khanate until the mid-late 18th century, when the Russian Empire conquered the Hetmanate and annexed the Khanate.

In the second half of the 17th century, settlers and fugitives from Hetman's Ukraine and Muscovy settled the lands north of the Donets river. Early settlements established during that period included Tor (modern Sloviansk) and Bakhmut; both served as border fortifications, and their population engaged in salt production. During the mid-18th century, two regiments of Serb colonists were settled along the Donets, establishing the region of Slavo-Serbia. During that period lands of modern-day Donbas were divided between Zaporozhian Sich, Don Host and Sloboda Ukraine. Following the dissolution of the Sich most of the region became part of Yekaterinoslav Governorate, with eastern parts being incorporated by Don Host Oblast.

At the end of the 18th century, many Russians, Ukrainians, Serbs and Greeks migrated to lands along the southern course of the Donets river, into an area previously inhabited by nomadic Nogais, who were nominally subject to the Crimean Khanate. Tsarist Russia named the conquered territories "New Russia" (Russian: Новороссия, Novorossiya). The new settlers chiefly engaged in animal husbandry, but starting from the 1830s grain cultivation started as well.

=== Beginning of industrialization ===
As the Industrial Revolution took hold across Europe, the vast coal resources of the region, discovered in 1721, began to be exploited in the mid-late 19th century. Starting from the late 18th century, exploitation of coal deposits started, and several early steel mills were established in Luhansk (1795), near Yenakiieve (1859-1864) and in Lysychansk (1866-1870). It was at this point that the name Donbas came into use, derived from the term "Donets Coal Basin" (Ukrainian: Донецький вугільний басейн; Russian: Донецкий каменноугольный бассейн), referring to the area along the Donets river where most of the coal reserves were found. The rise of the coal industry led to a population boom in the region, largely driven by Russian settlers.

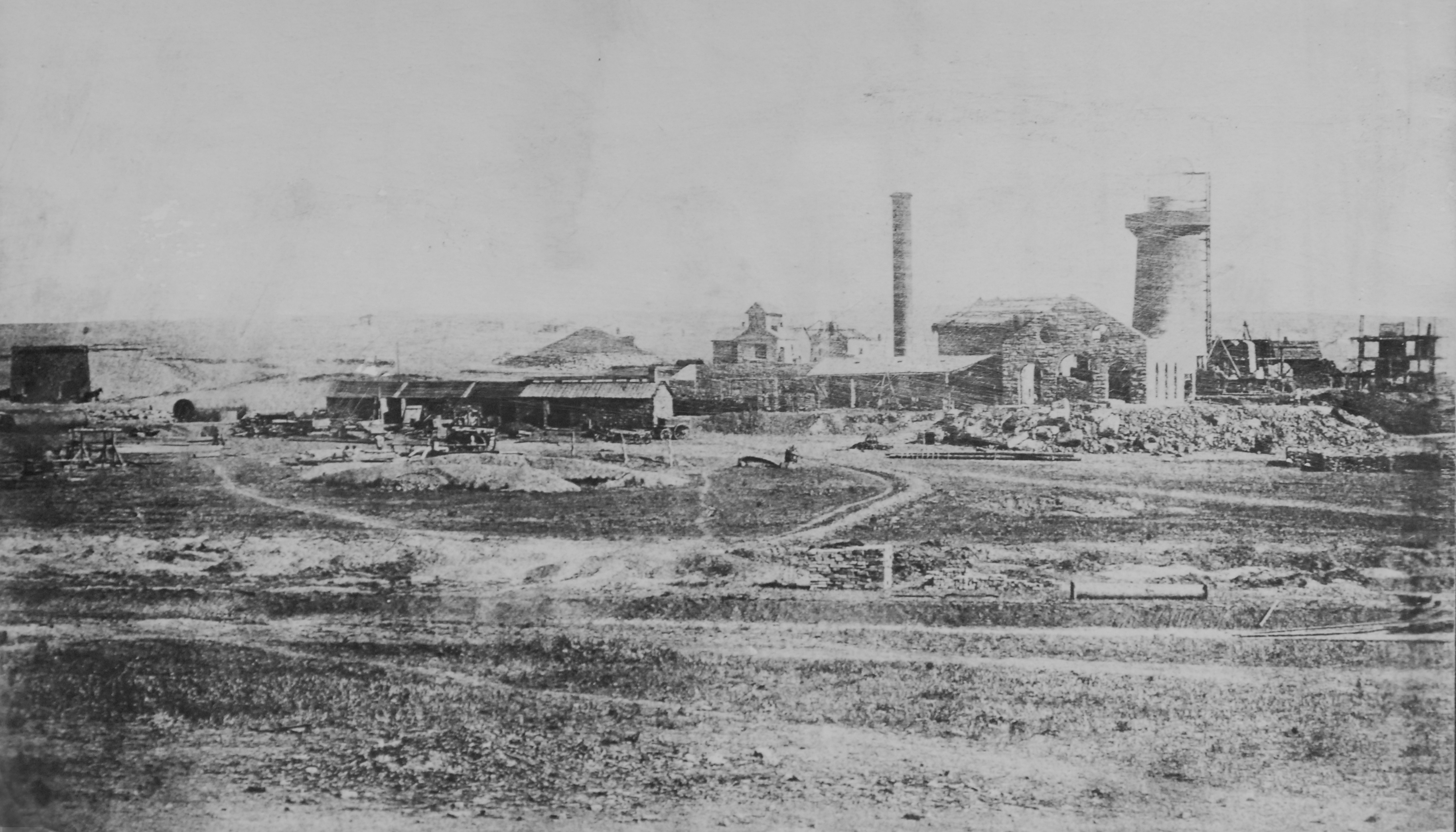
Yuzivka plant in 1872

Donetsk, the most important city in the region today, was founded in 1869 by Welsh businessman John Hughes on the site of the old Zaporozhian Cossack town of Oleksandrivka. Hughes built a steel mill and established several collieries in the region. The city was named after him as Yuzivka (Ukrainian: Юзівка) or Yuzovka (Russian: Юзовка). With the development of Yuzovka and similar cities, large numbers of landless peasants from peripheral governorates of the Russian Empire came looking for work.

With the construction of first railways, especially the Catherine Railway, which in 1884 connected the area with Kryvbas iron ore deposits, rapid industrial growth started with participation of foreign capital from France, Belgium, Germany, United Kingdom and other countries. The factory in Yuzivka was followed by steel mills in Sulin (1872), Druzhkivka (1894), Alchevsk (1896), Petrovske (1897), Kramatorsk (1897), Makiivka (1899) and Kadiivka (1899). Between 1880 and 1900 coal production in Donbas increased from 1,4 to 11 million tons, and the number of coal miners working in the area had reached 68,000. By 1900 Donbas overtook the Urals industrial region by production of pig iron. Despite the rapid industrial growth, local industry greatly suffered from the economic crises of 1873-1875, 1881-1882 and 1900-1902. Rapid growth resumed in the years preceding World War I.

According to the Russian Imperial Census of 1897, Ukrainians ("Little Russians", in the official imperial language) accounted for 52.4% of the population of the region, whilst ethnic Russians constituted 28.7%. Ethnic Greeks, Germans, Jews and Tatars also had a significant presence in the Donbas, particularly in the district of Mariupol, where they constituted 36.7% of the population. Despite this, Russians constituted the majority of the industrial workforce. Ukrainians dominated rural areas, but cities were often inhabited solely by Russians who had come seeking work in the region's heavy industries. Most ethnic Russian migrants to the Donbas stemmed from the Central Black Earth Region. Those Ukrainians who did move to the cities for work were quickly assimilated into the Russian-speaking worker class. As a result, Donbas became the most Russified region of Ukraine.

=== Russian Revolutions and Civil War ===
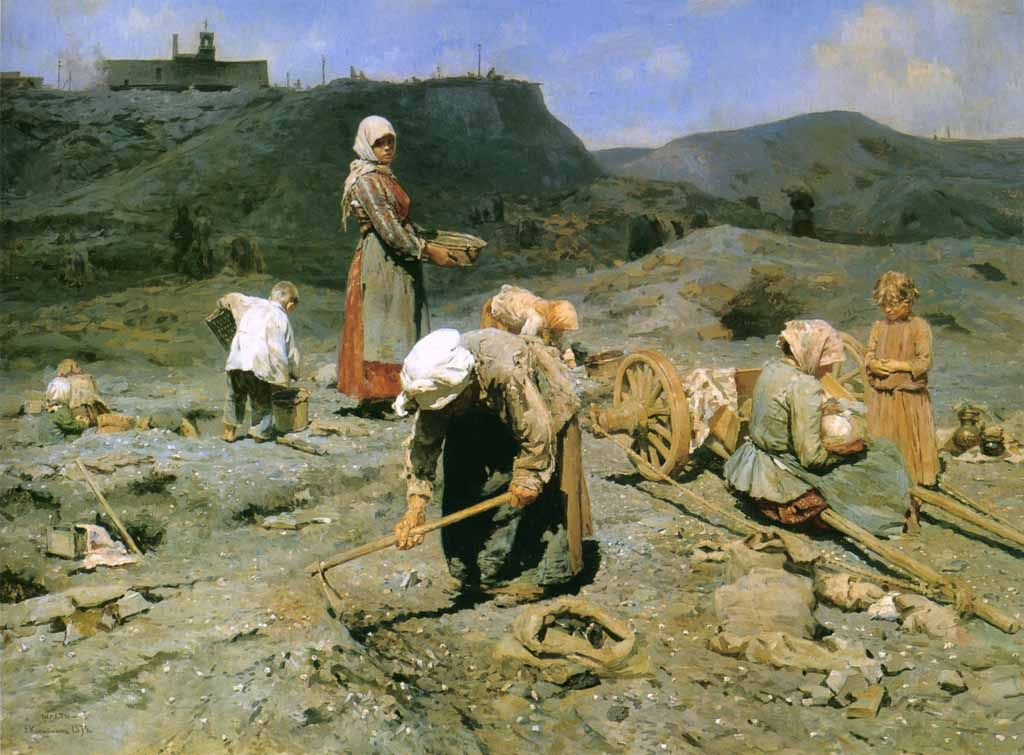
Poor Collecting Coal by Nikolay Kasatkin: Donbas, 1894

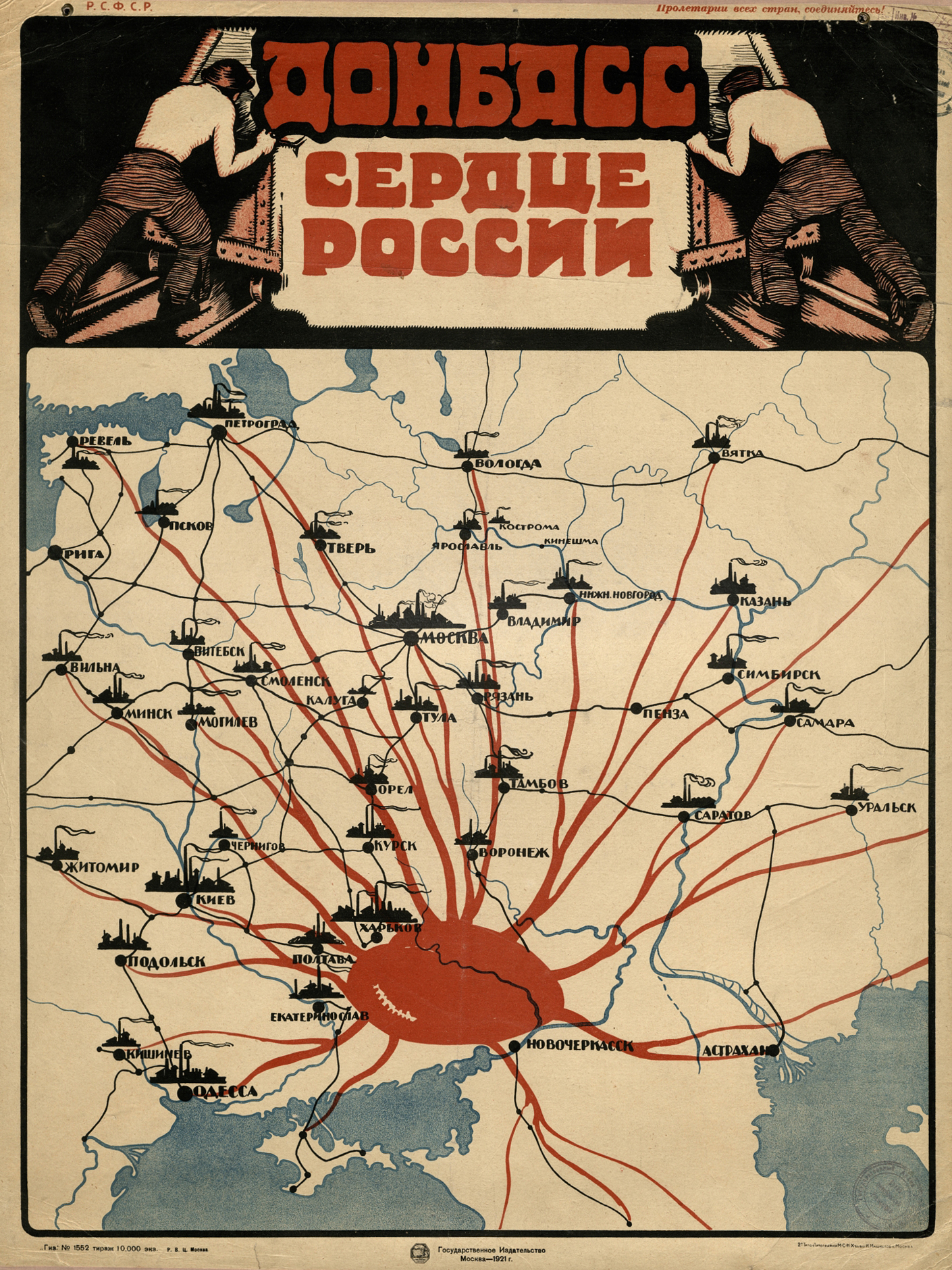
A Soviet Russian propaganda poster from 1921 that says "The Donbas is the heart of Russia"

Poor living and working conditions of workers led to regular strike actions, which were suppressed by the Russian police and gendarmerie. A major wave of strikes engulfed the Donbas during the Russian Revolution of 1905. In December 1905 a major workers' uprising took place in Horlivka, leading to a bloody crackdown against its participants. The Ukrainian national movement didn't have a significant influence on the region, although separate members of Ukrainian intelligentsia did attempt to spread national consciousness among the workers, publishing literary works on the topic of working life and establishing Prosvita branches.

Following the February Revolution of 1917, Social Revolutionaries, Mensheviks and Bolsheviks established a significant influence on the working classes in Donbas. For a while, the government bodies of the Ukrainian People's Republic operated in the Donbas alongside their Russian Provisional Government equivalents. However, as a major part of the workers belonged to Russian ethnicity, Ukrainian politicians were unable to get significant support. Local Bolsheviks, headed by Fyodor Sergeyev (Artyom), Kliment Voroshilov and Alexander Parkhomenko, succeeded in establishing Soviet power in parts of the Donbas with the help of forces led by Yegorov, which were dispatched from Moscow. Local Red Guards led the fight against Kaledin's Don Cossacks in the east and forces of Central Rada in the west. In December 1917, Donbas Bolsheviks supported the creation of a puppet Soviet government of Ukraine in Kharkiv. Following the beginning of a joint offensive by Ukrainian and German forces in February 1918, the short-lived Donetsk-Krivoi Rog Soviet Republic was proclaimed.

In April 1918 troops loyal to the Ukrainian People's Republic took control of large parts of the region. The Ukrainian State, the successor of the Ukrainian People's Republic, was able in May 1918 to bring the region under its control for a short time with the help of its German and Austro-Hungarian allies. During that period, Ukrainian administration also spread its power on Taganrog uezd, which had previously been part of Don Cossack lands. According to a treaty between the Ukrainian State and Don Host, which was signed on 8 August 1918, the border between the two parties was established along the eastern border of Yekaterinoslav Governorate, with some additional areas east of Mariupol being transferred to Ukraine. A joint commission was established with involvement of both sides in order to preserve the region's economic unity.

Soon after the establishment of the Directorate of Ukraine, in early 1919 Donbas once again came under Bolshevik control, but was soon thereafter captured by forces of the Volunteer Army. During the 1917–22 Russian Civil War, Nestor Makhno, who commanded the Revolutionary Insurgent Army of Ukraine, was the most popular leader in the Donbas.

=== Soviet period (1919–1941) ===
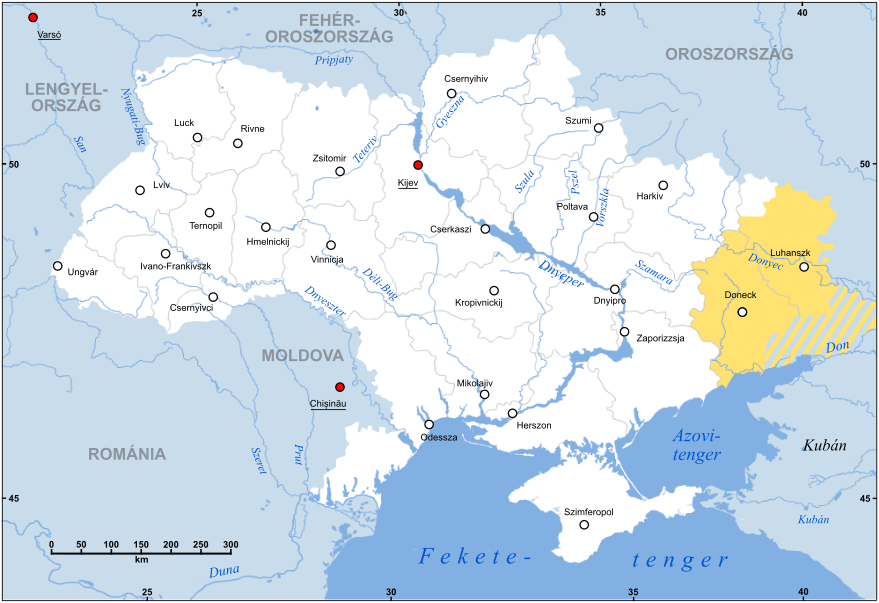
Map of the historical region of Donbas, within modern-day Ukraine and the Rostov Oblast of Russia

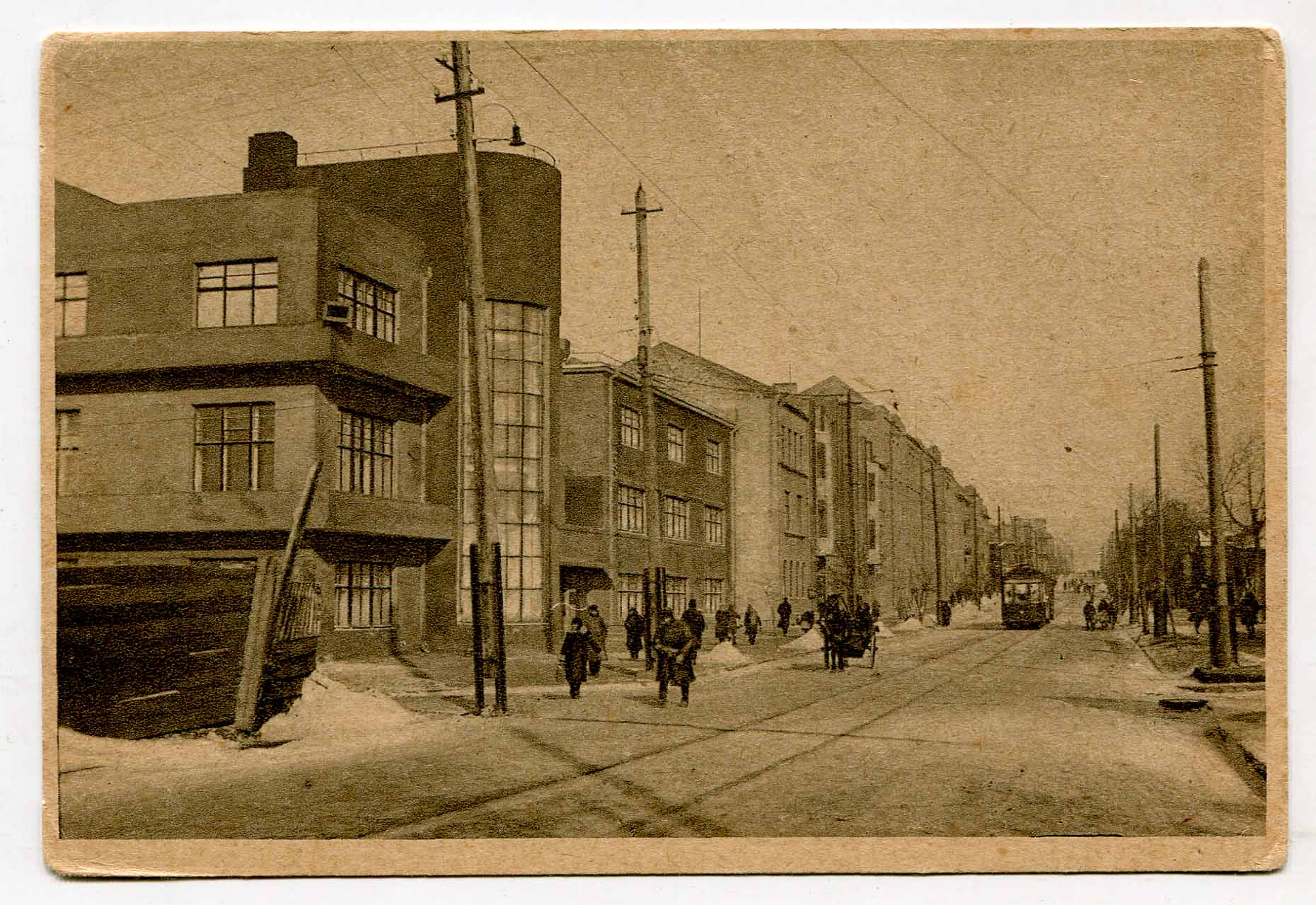
Main street of Stalino in 1930

In December 1919 Bolshevik control was restored, and Donbas was incorporated into the Ukrainian Soviet Socialist Republic as a separate governorate with centre in Bakhmut. Cossacks in the region were subjected to decossackisation during 1919–1921. In 1924 administrative borders of Ukrainian SSR were modified, with parts of eastern Donbas, including the cities of Shakhty, Sulin and Taganrog, being transferred to Russian SFSR.

As a result of revolution and war, most of the industry in the Donbas was destroyed. Between 1913 and 1920 coal production had decreased from 25,3 to 4,6 millions of tons, and iron production was at 0,5% of the pre-war level, with only one factory in Yenakiieve remaining in operation. As a result of reconstruction works, by 1928-1929 the pre-war levels of coal, iron and steel production were restored. Migration of workforce, mainly from Russia, continued, with the population of Yuzivka exceeding 100,000 inhabitants. During the second half of 1920s and early 1930s Donbas underwent Ukrainization, with part of the press and several educational establishments adopting Ukrainian language in their activities.

However, Ukrainization in Donbas was conducted at a smaller scale than in other regions, and by 1933 the policy had been abandoned, starting a new wave of Russification and repressions against Ukrainian activists. Ukrainians in the Donbas were greatly affected by the 1932–33 Holodomor famine and the Russification policy of Joseph Stalin. As most ethnic Ukrainians were rural peasant farmers, they bore the brunt of the famine.

Starting from the late 1920s, rapid industrialization led to the reconsturtion of old and establishment of new enterprises, including some new branches such as machine-building and chemical industry. By 1940, annual coal production had reached 83,7 million tons. Due to repression and collectivization, most of the new workers settling in the Donbas arrived from other regions of Ukraine. As a result of migration, Donbas became the biggest urban agglomeration in Ukraine, with the region's population growing from 2,960,000 to 5,940,000 inhabitants between 1929 and 1939.

=== Nazi occupation (1941–1943) ===
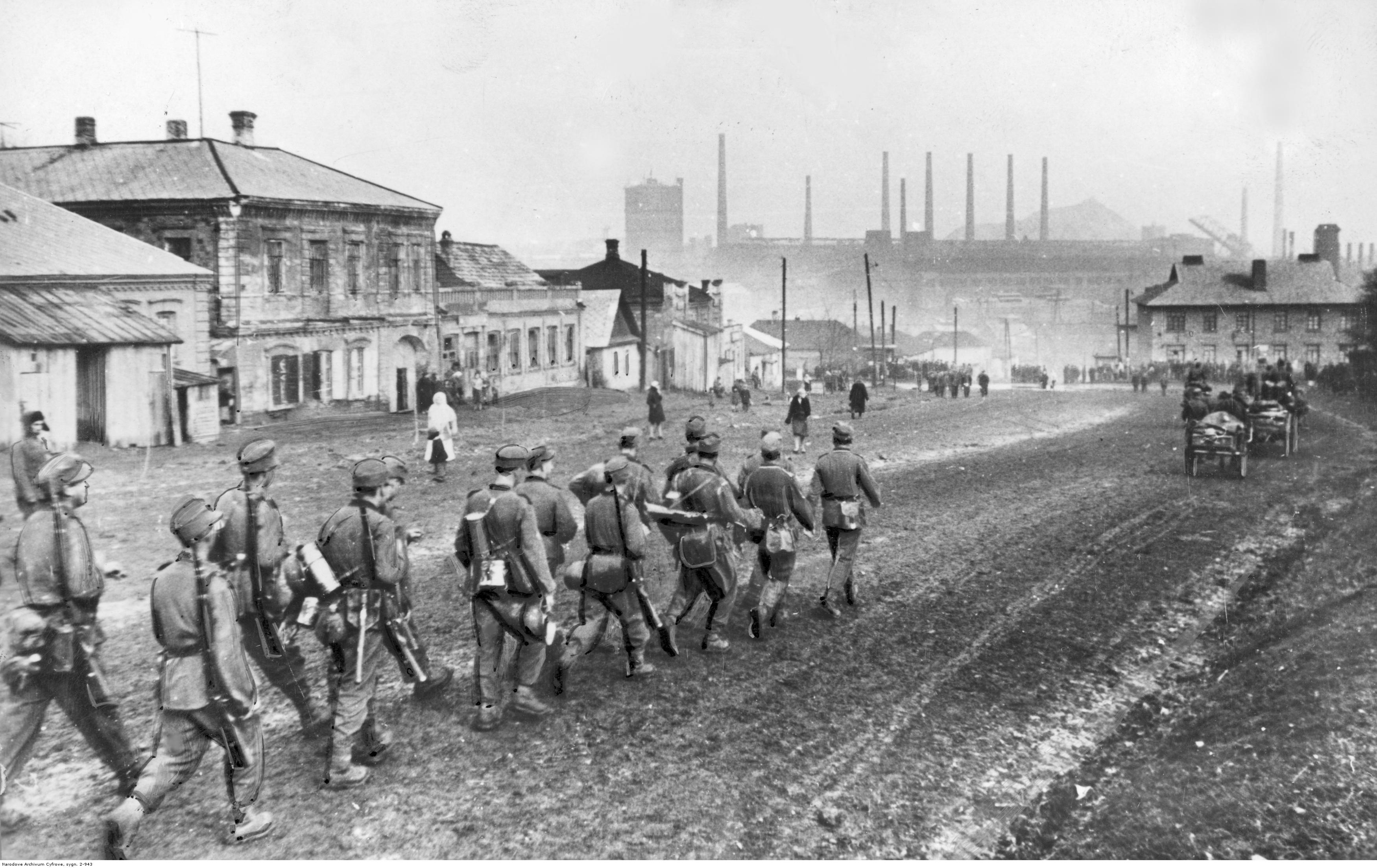
German troops marching through Stalino, October 1941

The Donbas was greatly affected by the Second World War. In the lead-up to the war, the region was racked by poverty and food shortages. War preparations resulted in an extension of the working day for factory labourers, whilst those who deviated from the heightened standards were arrested. Nazi Germany's leader Adolf Hitler viewed the resources of the Donbas as critical to Operation Barbarossa. As such, the Donbas suffered under Nazi occupation during 1941 and 1942.

Thousands of industrial labourers were deported to Nazi Germany for use in factories. In what was then called Stalino Oblast, now Donetsk Oblast, 279,000 civilians were killed over the course of the occupation. In Voroshilovgrad Oblast, now Luhansk Oblast, 45,649 were killed.

In 1943 the Operation Little Saturn and Donbas strategic offensive by the Red Army resulted in the return of Donbas to Soviet control. The war had taken its toll, leaving the region both destroyed and depopulated. As a result of wartime destruction, the region's infrastructure was severely damaged. Coal and metal production levels from 1940 were only restored in 1949.

=== Soviet period (1943–1991) ===
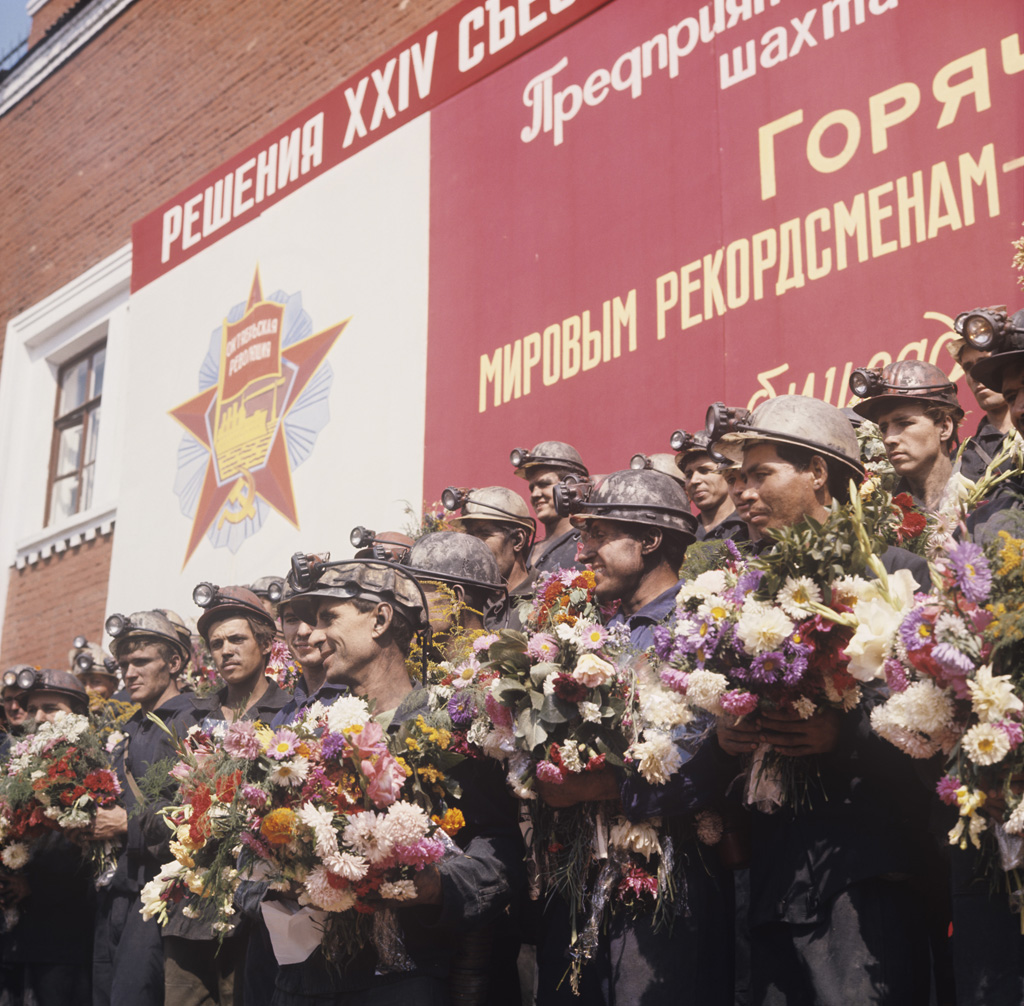
A brigade of Donetsk miners in 1971

During the reconstruction of the Donbas after the end of the Second World War, large numbers of Russian workers arrived to repopulate the region, further altering the population balance. In 1926, 639,000 ethnic Russians resided in the Donbas, and Ukrainians made up 60% of the population. As a result of the Russification policy, the Ukrainian population of the Donbass then declined drastically as ethnic Russians settled in the region in large numbers.

Despite the postwar reconstruction, as of 1955 35% of miners in the Donbas continued to work manually, although mechanization gradually increased. Over 70% of workforce in the mines consisted of young people, with levels of employee turnover reaching 40%. As a result of high production costs, 70% of Donbas coal was consumed in Ukraine, with the rest being exported to other parts of the USSR and abroad. In 1957 production of internal combustion locomotives was launched at Luhansk Locomotive Factory. During the same year, Ukraine's most powerful thermal power station started operation. Gradual electrification of railways and connection of the region to natural gas supplies started. In 1954 works on the construction of Siverskyi Donets – Donbas Canal began. By 1956, 90% of the region's population was urbanized.

By 1959, the ethnic Russian population was 2.55 million. Russification was further advanced by the 1958–59 Soviet educational reforms, which led to the near elimination of all Ukrainian-language schooling in the Donbas. By the time of the Soviet Census of 1989, 45% of the population of the Donbas reported their ethnicity as Russian. In 1990, the Interfront of the Donbass was founded as a movement against Ukrainian independence.

=== In independent Ukraine (from 1991) ===
A map showing the present-day definition of the Donbas within Ukraine

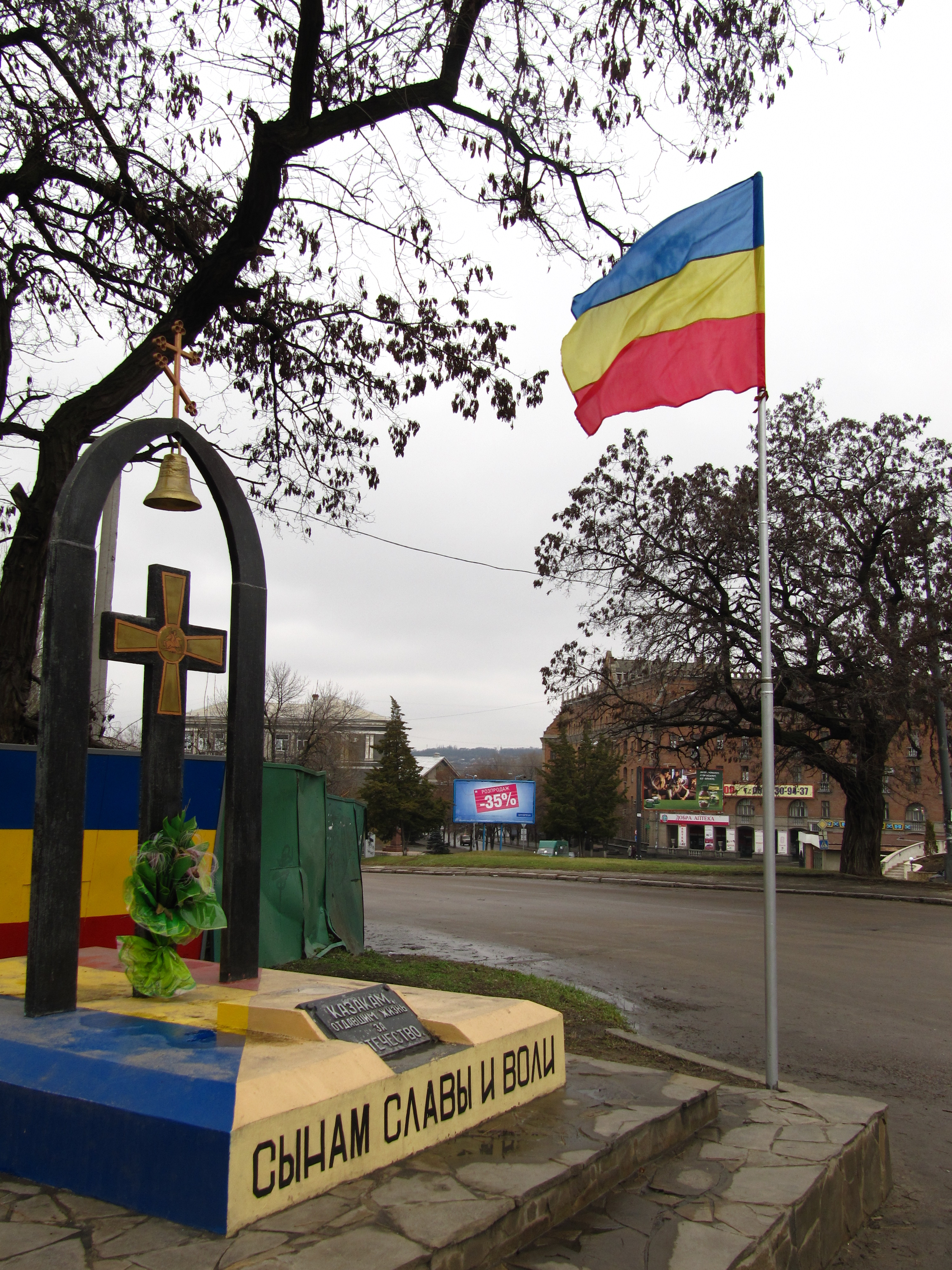
A monument to Don Cossacks in Luhansk. "To the sons of glory and freedom".

In the 1991 referendum on Ukrainian independence, 83.9% of voters in Donetsk Oblast and 83.6% in Luhansk Oblast supported independence from the Soviet Union. Turnout was 76.7% in Donetsk Oblast and 80.7% in Luhansk Oblast. In October 1991, a congress of South-Eastern deputies from all levels of government took place in Donetsk, where delegates demanded federalisation.

The region's economy deteriorated severely in the ensuing years. By 1993, industrial production had collapsed, and average wages had fallen by 80% since 1990. The Donbas fell into crisis, with many accusing the new central government in Kyiv of mismanagement and neglect. Donbas coal miners went on strike in 1993, causing a conflict that was described by historian Lewis Siegelbaum as "a struggle between the Donbas region and the rest of the country". One strike leader said that Donbas people had voted for independence because they wanted "power to be given to the localities, enterprises, cities", not because they wanted heavily centralised power moved from "Moscow to Kyiv".

This strike was followed by a 1994 consultative referendum on various constitutional questions in Donetsk and Luhansk oblasts, held concurrently with the first parliamentary elections in independent Ukraine. These questions included whether Russian should be declared an official language of Ukraine, whether Russian should be the language of administration in Donetsk and Luhansk oblasts, whether Ukraine should federalise, and whether Ukraine should have closer ties with the Commonwealth of Independent States. Close to 90% of voters voted in favour of these propositions. None of them were adopted since the vote was nationwide. Ukraine remained a unitary state, Ukrainian was retained as the sole official language, and the Donbas gained no autonomy. Nevertheless, the Donbas strikers gained many economic concessions from Kyiv, allowing for an alleviation of the economic crisis in the region.

Small strikes continued throughout the 1990s, though demands for autonomy faded. Some subsidies to Donbas heavy industries were eliminated, and many mines were closed by the Ukrainian government because of liberalising reforms pushed for by the World Bank.

In 1994, Russia, Ukraine, the United States and the United Kingdom signed the Budapest Memorandum prohibited the signatories to from threaten or use military force or economic coercion against Ukraine, amongst others.

In the 1994 presidential election and the 1999 Ukrainian presidential election, it was Leonid Kuchma, who was re-elected as president of Ukraine with support from the Donbas and other areas in eastern Ukraine. President Kuchma gave economic aid to the Donbas, using development money to gain political support in the region.

Power in the Donbas became concentrated in a regional political elite, known as oligarchs, during the early 2000s. Privatisation of state industries led to rampant corruption. Regional historian Hiroaki Kuromiya described this elite as the "Donbas clan", a group of people that controlled economic and political power in the region. Prominent members of the "clan" included Viktor Yanukovych and Rinat Akhmetov.

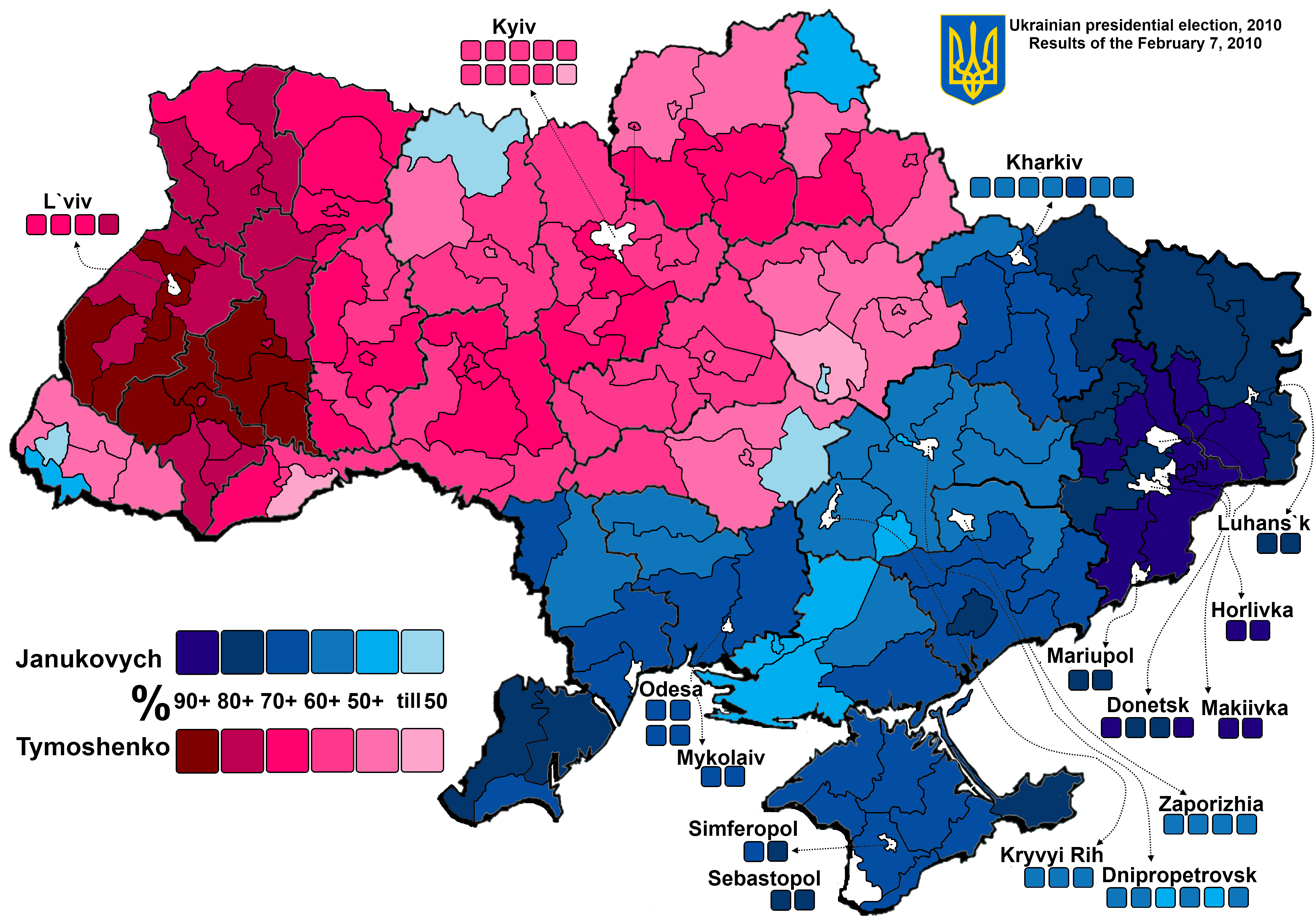
During the 2010 Ukrainian presidential election, most people in Donbas voted for Viktor Yanukovych.

A brief attempt at gaining autonomy by pro-Viktor Yanukovych politicians and officials was made in 2004 during the Orange Revolution. The so-called South-East Ukrainian Autonomous Republic was intended to consist out of nine South-Eastern regions of Ukraine. The project was initiated on 26 November 2004 by the Luhansk Oblast Council, and was discontinued the next month by the Donetsk Oblast Council. On 28 November 2004, in Sievierodonetsk, the so-called First All-Ukraine Congress of People's Deputies And Local-Council's Deputies took place, organised by the supporters of Viktor Yanukovych.

A total of 3,576 delegates from 16 oblasts of Ukraine, the Autonomous Republic of Crimea and Sevastopol took part in the congress, claiming to represent over 35 million citizens. Moscow Mayor Yurii Luzhkov and an advisor from the Russian Embassy were present in the presidium. There were calls for the appointment of Viktor Yanukovych as president of Ukraine or prime minister, for declaring of martial law in Ukraine, dissolution of the Verkhovna Rada, creation of self-defence forces, and for the creation of a federative South-Eastern state with its capital in Kharkiv.

Donetsk Mayor Oleksandr Lukyanchenko, however, stated that no one wanted autonomy, but rather sought to stop the Orange Revolution demonstrations going on at the time in Kyiv and negotiate a compromise. After the Orange Revolution's victory, some of the organisers of the congress were charged with "encroachment upon the territorial integrity and inviolability of Ukraine", but no convictions were made.

In other parts of Ukraine during the 2000s, the Donbas was often perceived as having a "thug culture", as being a "Soviet cesspool", and as "backward". Writing in the Narodne slovo newspaper in 2005, commentator Viktor Tkachenko said that the Donbas was home to "fifth columns", and that speaking Ukrainian in the region was "not safe for one's health and life". It was also portrayed as being home to pro-Russian separatism. The Donbas is home to a significantly higher number of cities and villages that were named after Communist figures compared to the rest of Ukraine. Despite this portrayal, surveys taken across that decade and during the 1990s showed strong support for remaining within Ukraine and insignificant support for separatism.

=== Russo-Ukrainian War (2014–present) ===
==== War in Donbas ====
A map of the region during the frozen conflict phase of the Donbas war, from the conclusion of the Battle of Debaltseve in 2015 until the February 2022 Russian invasion of Ukraine

From the beginning of March 2014, demonstrations by pro-Russian and anti-government groups took place in the Donbas, as part of the aftermath of the Revolution of Dignity and the Euromaidan movement. These demonstrations, which followed the annexation of Crimea by the Russian Federation, and which were part of a wider group of concurrent pro-Russian protests across southern and eastern Ukraine, escalated in April 2014 into a war between the Russian-backed separatist forces of the self-declared Donetsk and Luhansk People's Republics (DPR and LPR respectively), and the Ukrainian government.

Amid that conflict, the self-proclaimed republics held referendums on the status of Donetsk and Luhansk oblasts on 11 May 2014. In the referendums, viewed as illegal by Ukraine and undemocratic by the international community, about 90% voted for the independence of the DPR and LPR. (Note: The Russian word used, самостоятельность, (samostoyatel'nost) (literally "standing by oneself"), can be translated as either full independence or broad autonomy, which left voters confused about what their ballot actually meant.)

The initial protests in the Donbas were largely native expressions of discontent with the new Ukrainian government. Russian involvement at this stage was limited to its voicing of support for the demonstrations. The emergence of the separatists in Donetsk and Luhansk began as a small fringe group of the protesters, independent of Russian control. This unrest, however, only evolved into an armed conflict because of Russian military backing for what had been a marginal group as part of the Russo-Ukrainian War. The conflict was thus, in the words of historian Hiroaki Kuromiya, "secretly engineered and cleverly camouflaged by outsiders".

There was limited support for separatism in the Donbas before the outbreak of the war, and little evidence of support for an armed uprising. Russian claims that Russian speakers in the Donbas were being persecuted or even subjected to "genocide" by the Ukrainian government, forcing its hand to intervene, were deemed false by Voice of America.

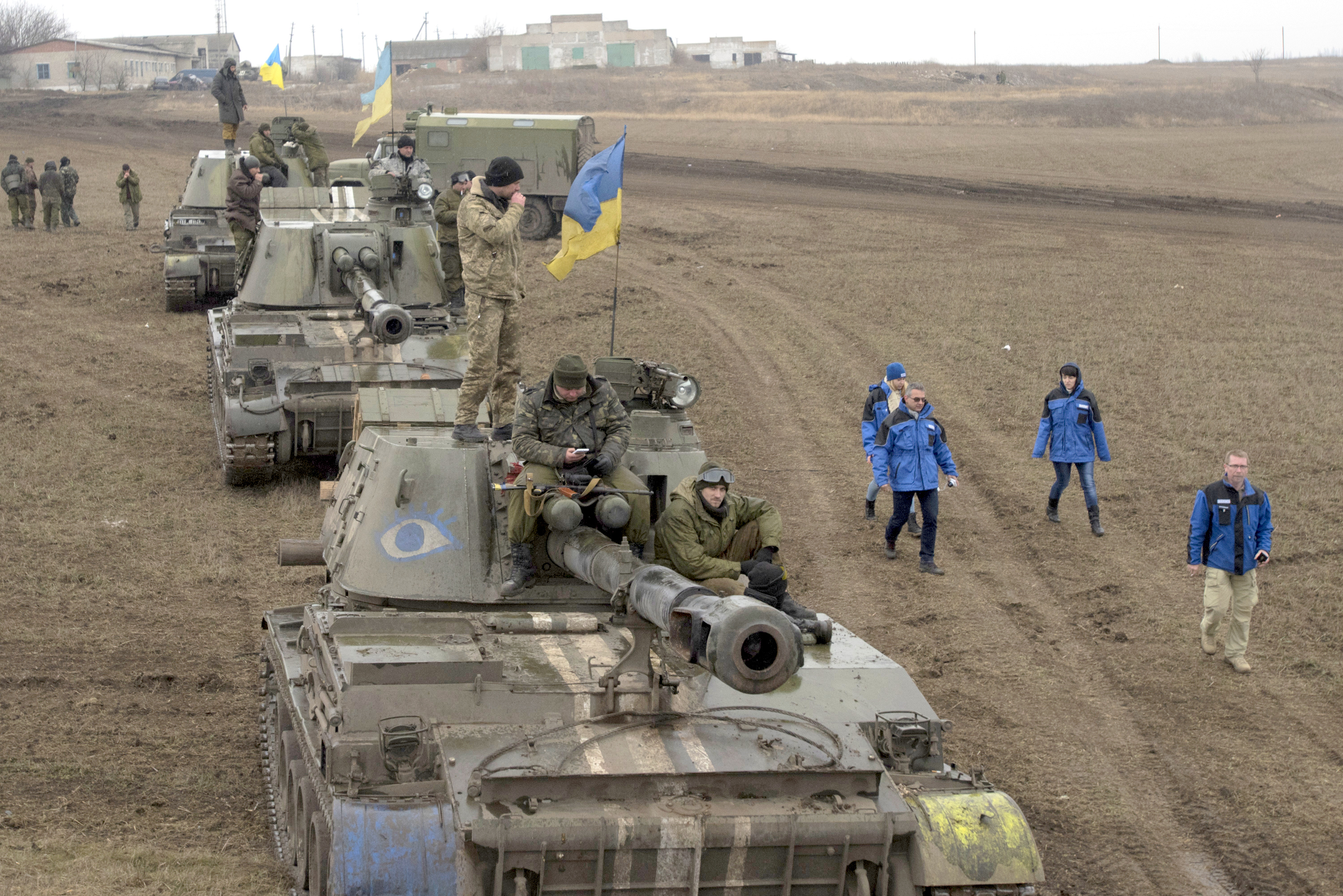
Ukrainian troops in the Donbas, March 2015

Fighting continued through the summer of 2014, and by August 2014, the Ukrainian "Anti-Terrorist Operation" was able to vastly shrink the territory under the control of the pro-Russian forces, and came close to regaining control of the Russo-Ukrainian border. In response to the deteriorating situation in the Donbas, Russia abandoned what has been called its "hybrid war" approach, and began a conventional invasion of the region. As a result of the Russian invasion, DPR and LPR insurgents regained much of the territory they had lost during the Ukrainian government's preceding military offensive.

Only this Russian intervention prevented an immediate Ukrainian resolution to the conflict. This forced the Ukrainian side to seek the signing of a ceasefire agreement. Called the Minsk Protocol, this was signed on 5 September 2014. As this failed to stop the fighting, another agreement, called Minsk II was signed on 12 February 2015. This agreement called for the eventual reintegration of the Donbas republics into Ukraine, with a level of autonomy. The aim of the Russian intervention in the Donbas was to establish pro-Russian governments that, upon reincorporation into Ukraine, would facilitate Russian interference in Ukrainian politics. The Minsk agreements were thus highly favourable to the Russian side, as their implementation would accomplish these goals.

The conflict led to a vast exodus from the Donbas: half the region's population were forced to flee their homes. A UN OHCHR report released on 3 March 2016 stated that, since the conflict broke out in 2014, the Ukrainian government registered 1.6 million internally displaced people who had fled the Donbas to other parts of Ukraine. Over 1 million were said to have fled elsewhere, mostly to Russia. At the time of the report, 2.7 million people were said to continue to live in areas under DPR and LPR control, comprising about one-third of the Donbas.

Despite the Minsk agreements, low-intensity fighting along the line of contact between Ukrainian government and Russian-controlled areas continued until 2022. Since the start of the conflict there have been 29 ceasefires, each intended to remain in force indefinitely, but none of them stopped the violence. This led the war to be referred to as a "frozen conflict". On 11 January 2017, the Ukrainian government approved a plan to reintegrate the occupied part of the Donbas and its population into Ukraine. The plan would give Russian-backed political entities partial control of the electorate and has been described by Zerkalo Nedeli as "implanting a cancerous cell into Ukraine's body." This was never implemented, and was subject to public protest.

A 2018 survey by Sociological Group "Rating" of residents of the Ukrainian-controlled parts of the Donbas found that 82% of respondents believed there was no discrimination against Russian-speaking people in Ukraine. Only 11% saw some evidence of discrimination. The same survey also found that 71% of respondents did not support Russia's military intervention to "protect" the Russian-speaking population, with only 9% offering support for that action. Another survey by Rating, conducted in 2019, found that only 23% of those Ukrainians polled supported granting the Donbas autonomous status, whilst 34% supported a ceasefire and "freezing" the conflict, 23% supported military action to recover the occupied Donbas territories, and 6% supported separating these territories from Ukraine.

==== Full-scale Russian invasion of Ukraine ====
On 21 February 2022, Russia officially recognised the independence of the Donetsk and Luhansk republics, effectively killing the Minsk agreements. Russia subsequently launched a new, full-scale invasion of Ukraine on 24 February 2022, which Russian president Vladimir Putin said was intended to "protect" the people of the Donbas from the "abuse" and "genocide" of the Ukrainian government. However, Putin's claims have been refuted. The DPR and LPR joined Russia's operation; the separatists stated that an operation to capture the entirety of Donetsk Oblast and Luhansk Oblast had begun.

On 18 April 2022, the battle of Donbas began, a Russian offensive in mid-2022 within the larger eastern Ukraine campaign.

By August 2026, the Institute for the Study of War reported that Putin had given 15 different deadlines to capture all of Donbas since 2022, with Russian forces failing to meet any of them.

== Demographics ==
=== Ethnicity and language ===
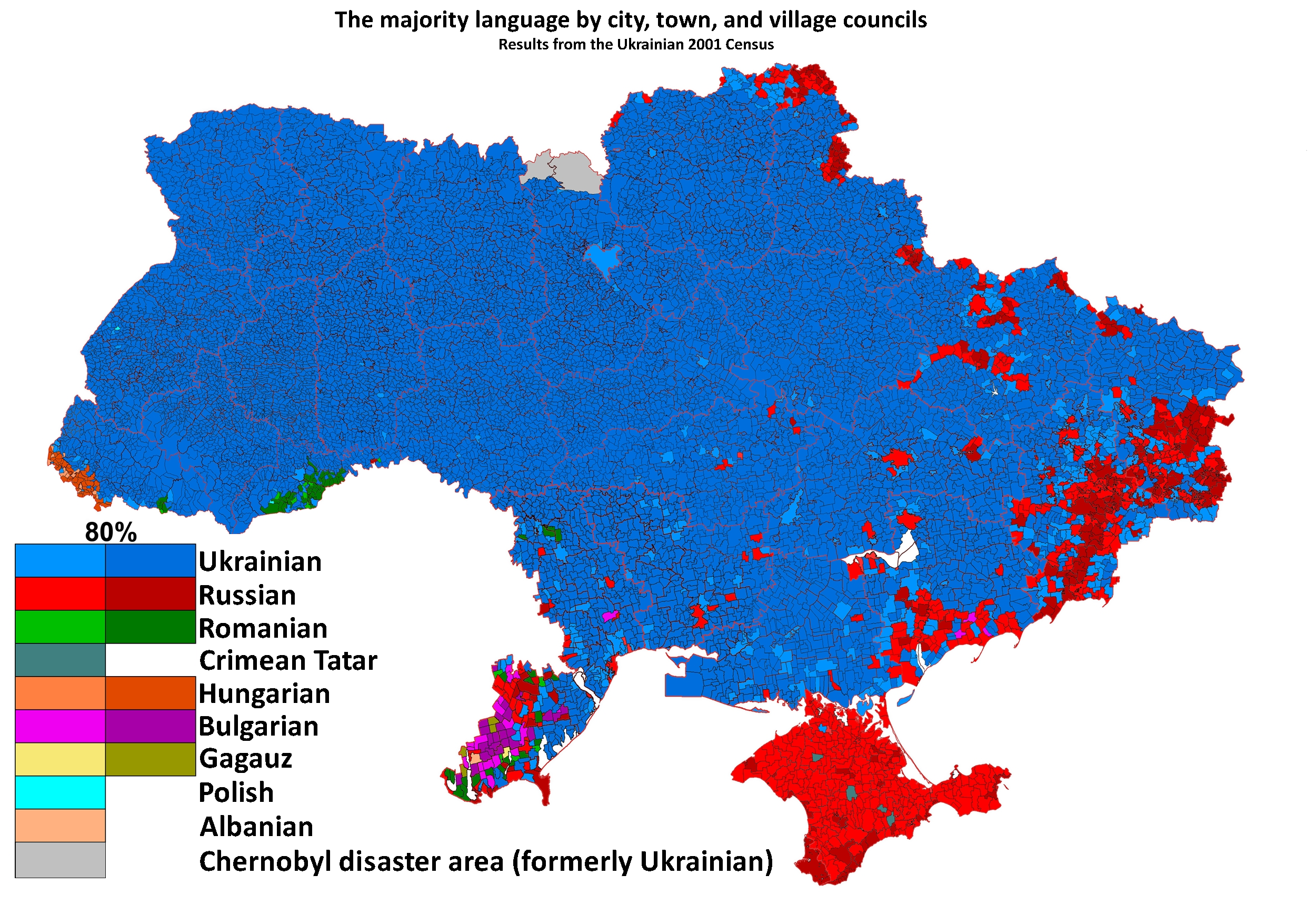
Districts with a majority of native Russian speakers are shown in red (census 2001).

Donbas is the most densely populated area of Ukraine. The easternmost part of the region is located outside of the Ukrainian ethnic territory.

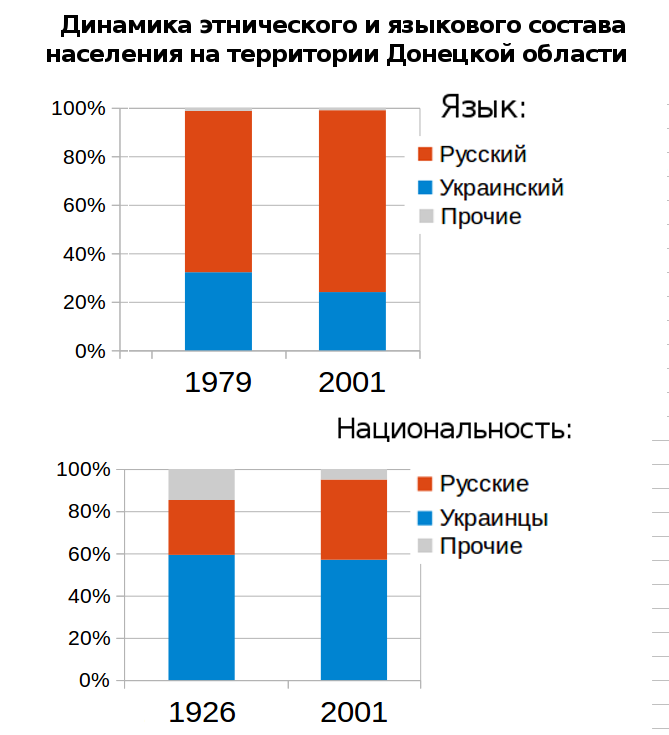
Demographic changes in Donetsk Oblast: the upper two columns depict language change over time, the lower two – nationality (национальность) proportions. Russian, Ukrainian, others (according to official censuses in 1926, 2001).

Percentage of Ukrainians and Russians from 1897 to 2001
	1897	1926	1959	1989	2001
Ukrainians	55.2 %	60.0 %	56.4 %	51.1 %	57.3 %
Russians	26.2 %	31.4 %	38.0 %	44.0 %	38.5 %

According to the 2001 census, ethnic Ukrainians form 58% of the population of Luhansk Oblast and 56.9% of Donetsk Oblast. Ethnic Russians form the largest minority, accounting for 39% and 38.2% of the two oblasts respectively. In the present day, the Donbas is a predominately Russophone region. According to the 2001 census, Russian is the main language of 74.9% of residents in Donetsk Oblast and 68.8% in Luhansk Oblast.

Residents of Russian origin are mainly concentrated in the larger urban centers. Russian became the main language and lingua franca in the course of industrialization, boosted by the immigration of many Russians, particularly from Kursk Oblast, to newly founded cities in the Donbas. A subject of continuing research controversies, and often denied in these two oblasts, is the extent of forced emigration and deaths during the Soviet period, which particularly affected rural Ukrainians during the Holodomor which resulted as a consequence of early Soviet industrialization policies combined with two years of drought throughout southern Ukraine and the Volga region.

Nearly all Ukrainian Jews either fled or were murdered in the Holocaust in Ukraine during the German occupation in World War II. The Donbas is about 6% Muslim according to the official censuses of 1926 and 2001.

According to linguist George Shevelov, in the early 1920s the proportion of secondary schools teaching in the Ukrainian language was lower than the proportion of ethnic Ukrainians in the Donbas – even though the Soviet Union had ordered that all schools in the Ukrainian SSR should be Ukrainian-speaking (as part of its Ukrainization policy).

=== Religion ===
Religion in Donbas (2016)
1. Eastern Orthodoxy (50.6%)
2. Non-denominational Christianity (11.9%)
3. Islam (6.00%)
4. Protestantism (2.50%)
5. Hinduism (0.60%)
6. Not religious (28.3%)

According to a 2016 survey of religion in Ukraine held by the Razumkov Center, 65.0% of the population in the Donbas believe in Christianity (including 50.6% Orthodox, 11.9% who declared themselves to be "simply Christians", and 2.5% who belonged to Protestant churches). Islam is the religion of 6% of the population of the Donbas and Hinduism of the 0.6%, both the religions with a share of the population that is higher compared to other regions of Ukraine. People who declared to be not believers or believers in some other religions, not identifying in one of those listed, were 28.3% of the population.

=== Identity and politics ===
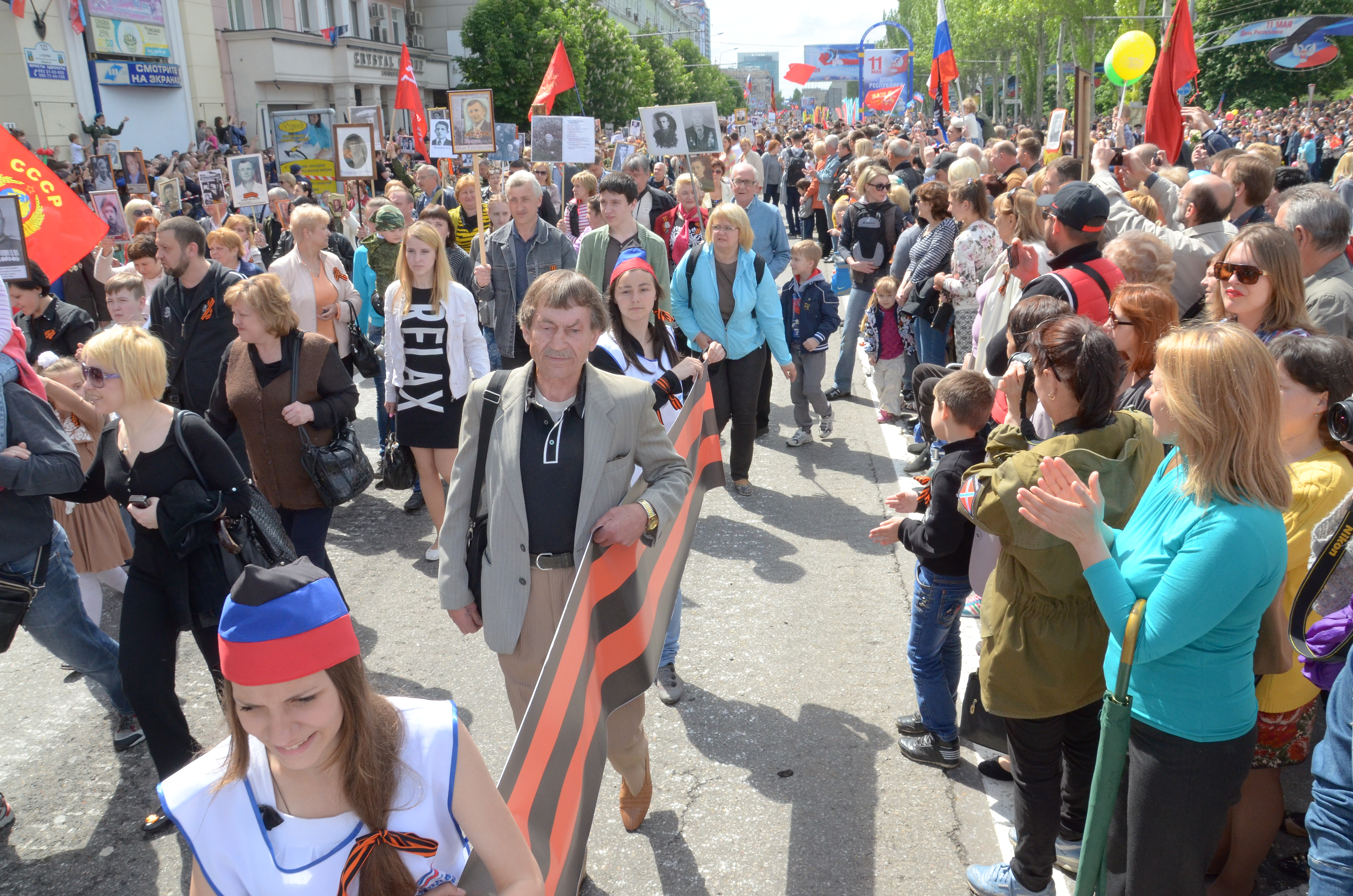
World War II Victory Day celebration in Donetsk, 9 May 2016

Surveys of regional identities in Ukraine have shown that around 40% of Donbas residents claim to have a "Soviet identity". Roman Horbyk of Södertörn University wrote that in the 20th century, "[a]s peasants from all surrounding regions were flooding its then busy mines and plants on the border of ethnically Ukrainian and Russian territories", "incomplete and archaic institutions" prevented Donbas residents from "acquiring a notably strong modern urban – and also national – new identity".

Prior to the Revolution of Dignity, the politics of the region were dominated by the pro-Russian Party of Regions, which gained about 50% of Donbas votes in the 2008 Ukrainian parliamentary election. Prominent members of that party, such as former Ukrainian president Viktor Yanukovych, were from the Donbas.

=== Major urban areas ===
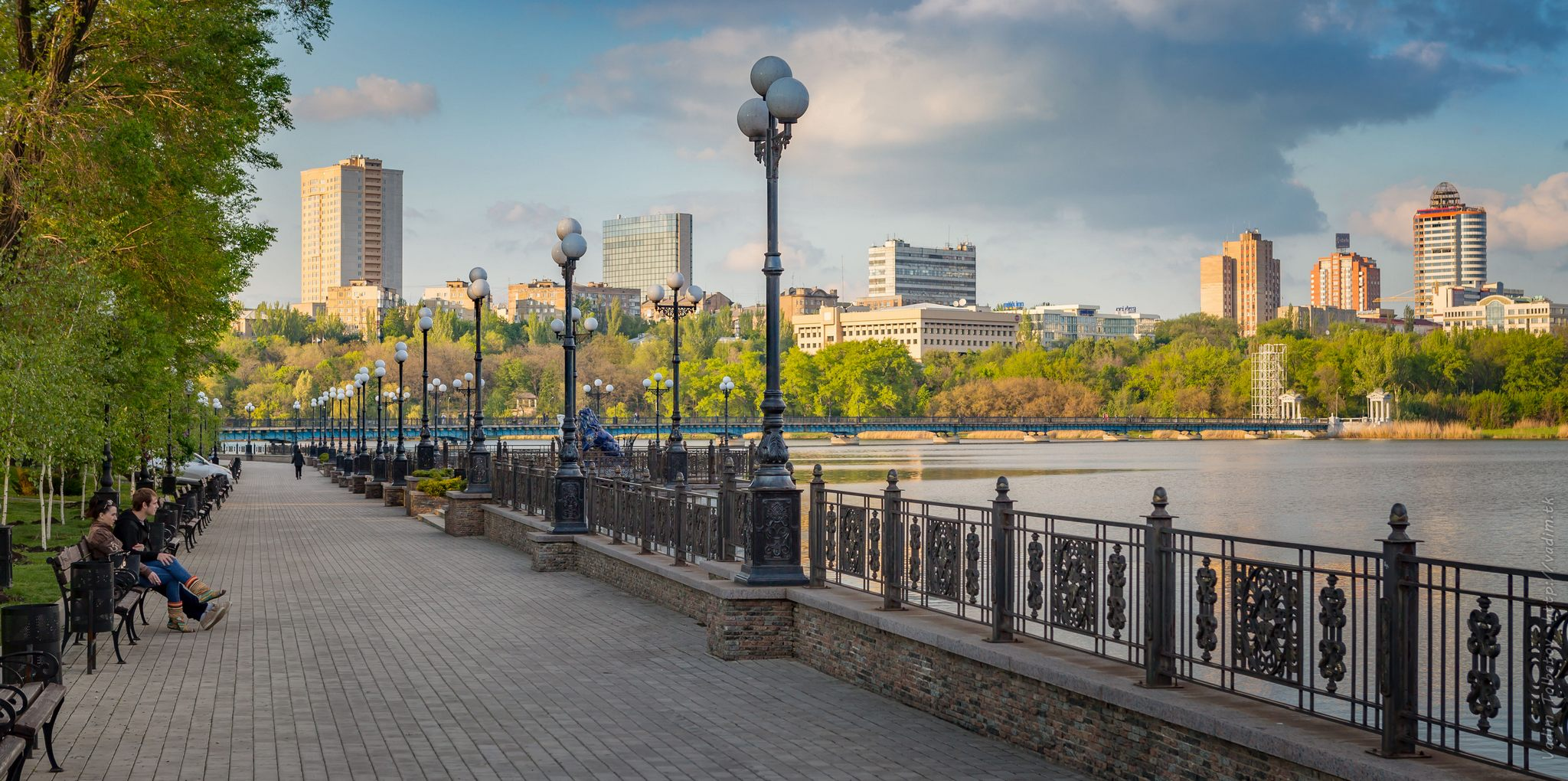
Donetsk, the economic center of Donbas

- Donetsk-Makiivka agglomeration
- Luhansk
- Horlivka-Yenakiieve agglomeration
- Kostiantynivka-Druzhkivka-Kramatorsk-Sloviansk
- Kadiivka-Alchevsk-Perevalsk-Irmino-Pervomaisk
- Lysychansk-Rubizhne-Siverodonetsk

== Economy ==
Donets Coal Basin

Donbas is the biggest industrial area in Ukraine and whole of Eastern Europe. Dominated by coal mining, metallurgy, machine building and chemical industry, the region has a beneficial geographic location, with sea routes, as well as sources of iron ore and manganese being located at a relatively short distance. Donbas has a dense railway network and has access to major waterways, such as Don, Volga and the Caspian Sea.

The Donbas' economy is dominated by heavy industry, such as coal mining and metallurgy. The region takes its name from an abbreviation of the term "Donets Coal Basin" (Ukrainian: Донецький вугільний басейн, Russian: Донецкий угольный бассейн), and while annual extraction of coal has decreased since the 1970s, the Donbas remains a significant producer. The Donbas represents one of the largest coal reserves in Ukraine, with estimated reserves of 60 billion tonnes of coal. The layer of carbon in the area reaches the thicknes of 2-4 kilometers. 80% of Donbas coal is located in the territory of Ukraine, with the rest being produced in Russia. Central and southwestern areas have deposits of coking coal, while in the northwest gas coal dominates. Central, southeastern and eastern areas of Donbas are rich with anthracite coal. Donbas coal is characterized with high shares of cinder and sulphur, which makes it less suitable for coking. Thinness of separate coal layers (form several centimeters to 2 meters) makes part of the coal impossible to retrieve unless underground gasification is employed.

Coal mining in the Donbas is conducted at very large depths. Lignite mining takes place at around 600 metres (2,000 ft) below the surface, whilst mining for the more valuable anthracite and bituminous coal takes place at depths of around 1,800 metres (5,900 ft). Prior to the start of the region's war in April 2014, Donetsk and Luhansk oblasts together produced about 30 percent of Ukraine's exports.

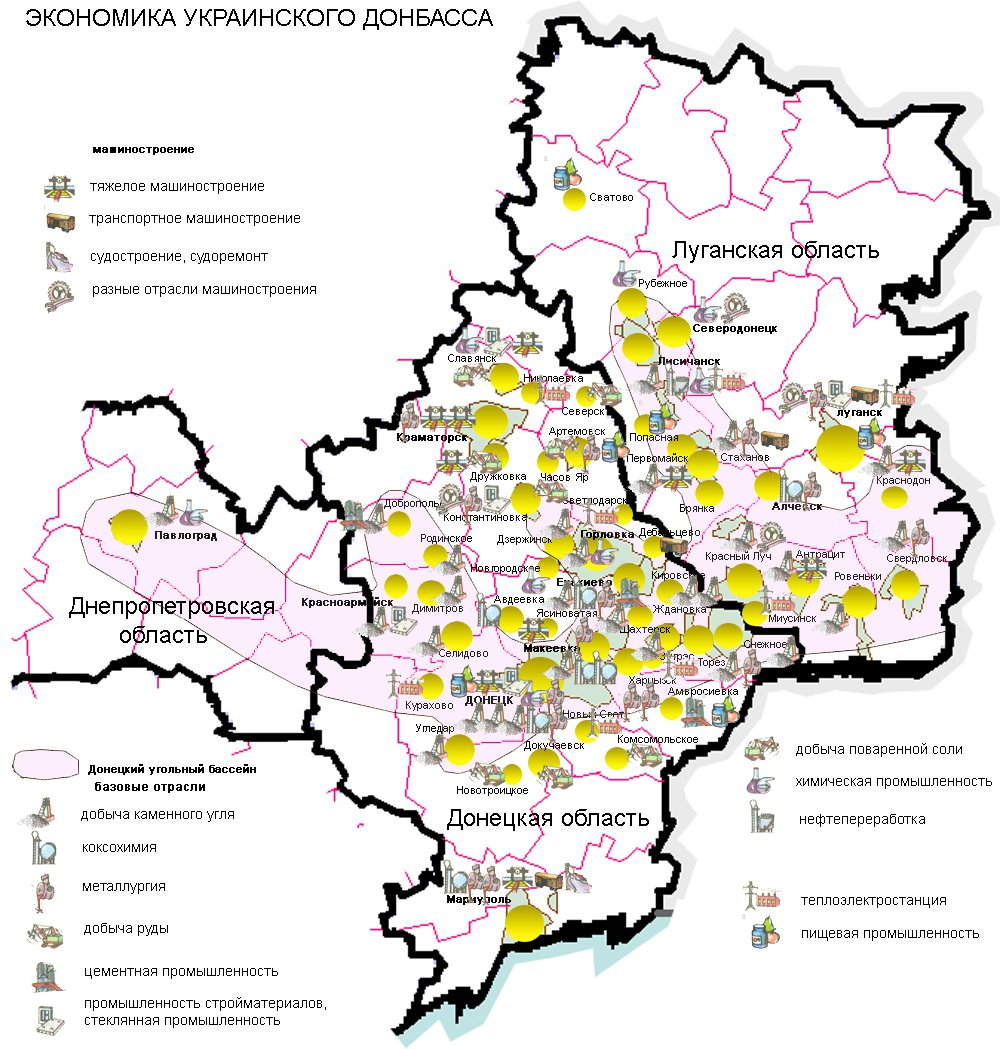
Economy of the Ukrainian Donbas

Among other valuable resources present in the Donbas region are salt, marl, limestone, clay and other construction materials, as well as smaller deposits of various ores. The biggest salt deposits are located in the area of Bakhmut (rock salt) and Sloviansk (cooking salt). Quicksilver deposits, by now mostly depleted, are present in the area of Mykytivka. In parts of the polymetallic ores such as zinc, tin, copper, silver and gold are present. Until the early 20th century, small amounts of poor iron ores were produces in the southwestern part of Donbas and around Bakhmut. Large deposits of flux limestones are present in the vicinity of Olenivka. Near Amvrosiivka, marl deposits have contributed to the development of cement production. Fire clay is produced in the areas of Chasiv Yar and Druzhkivka. Gypsum is present around Bakhmut, chalk along the Donets river, clay near Sloviansk, ochre in the vicinity of Izium, kaolin near Volnovakha.

Other industries in the Donetsk region include blast-furnace and steel-making equipment, railway freight-cars, metal-cutting machine-tools, tunneling machines, agricultural harvesters and ploughing systems, railway tracks, mining cars, electric locomotives, military vehicles, tractors and excavators. The region also produces consumer goods like household washing-machines, refrigerators, freezers, TV sets, leather footwear, and toilet soap. Over half its production is exported, and about 22% is exported to Russia.

In mid-March 2017, Ukrainian president Petro Poroshenko signed a decree on a temporary ban on the movement of goods to and from territory controlled by the self-proclaimed Donetsk People's Republic and Luhansk People's Republic, so since then Ukraine does not buy coal from the Donets Coal Basin.

Shale gas reserves, part of the larger Dnieper–Donets basin, are present in the Donbas, most notably the Yuzivska gas field. In an effort to reduce Ukrainian dependence on Russian gas imports, the Ukrainian government reached an agreement with Royal Dutch Shell in 2012 to develop the Yuzivska field. Shell was forced to freeze operations after the outbreak of war in the region in 2014, and officially withdrew from the project in June 2015.

In 2013 (before war) GDP of Donbas was ₴220 billion (€20 billion). The Gross regional product of Donbas was ₴335 billion (€10 billion) in 2021.

=== Occupational safety in the coal industry ===
The coal mines of the Donbas are some of the most hazardous in the world because of the deep depths of mines, as well as frequent methane explosions, coal-dust explosions, rock burst dangers, and outdated infrastructure. Even more hazardous illegal coal mines became very common across the region in the late 2000s.

=== Environmental problems ===
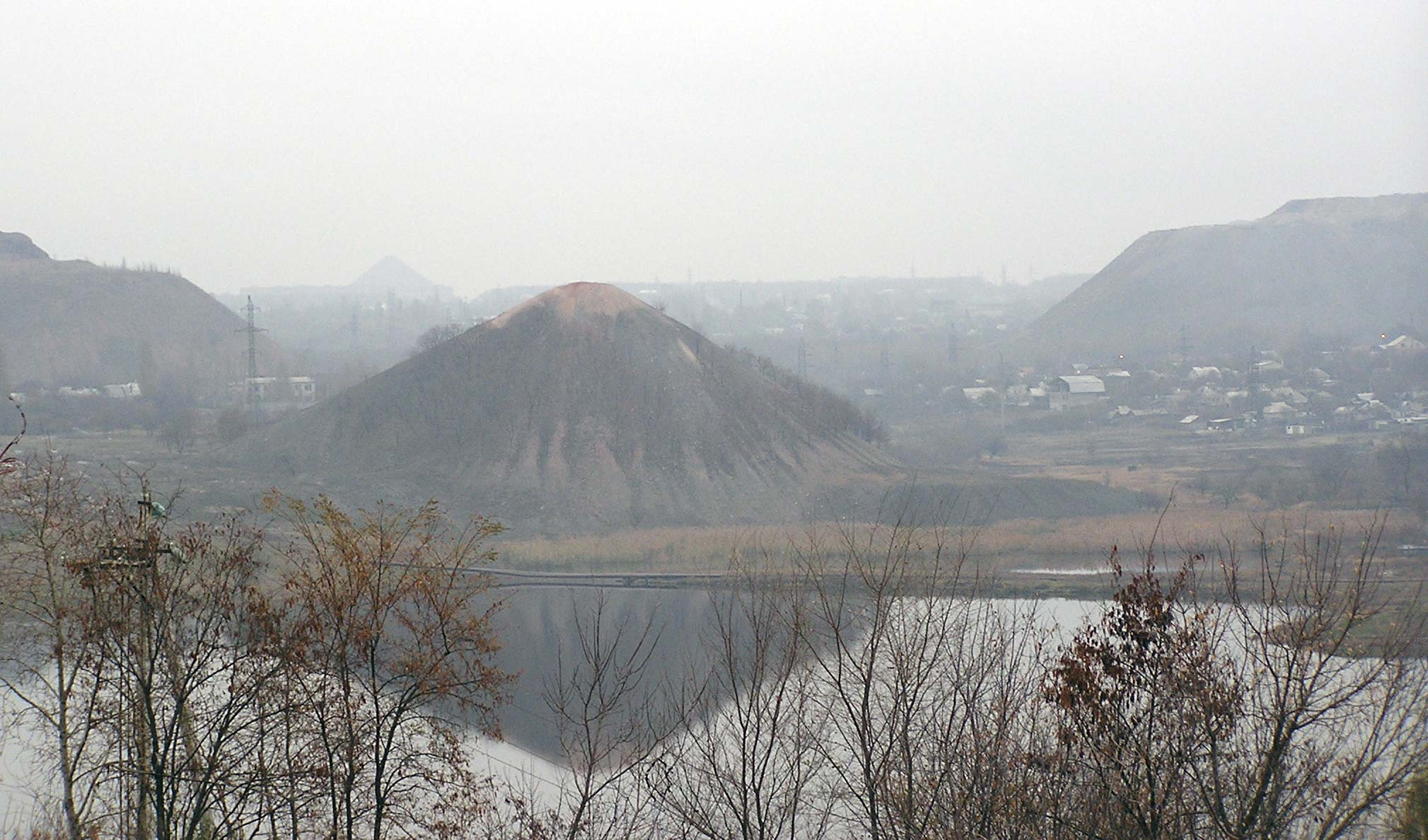
Coal-mining spoil tips along the Kalmius river in Donetsk

Intensive coal-mining and smelting in the Donbas have led to severe damage to the local environment. The most common problems throughout the region include:

- water-supply disruption and flooding due to the mine water
- visible air pollution around coke and steel mills
- air/water contamination and mudslide threat from spoil tips

Additionally, several chemical waste-disposal sites in the Donbas have not been maintained, and pose a constant threat to the environment. One unusual threat is the result of the Soviet-era 1979 project to test experimental nuclear mining in Yenakiieve. For example, on 16 September 1979, at the Yunkom coal mine, known today as the Young Communard mine in Yenakiyeve, a 300kt nuclear test explosion was conducted at 900m to free methane gas or to degasified coal seams into a sandstone oval dome known as the Klivazh [Rift] Site so that methane would not pose a hazard or threat to life. Before Glasnost, no miners were informed of the presence of radioactivity at the mine, however.

== Culture and religion ==
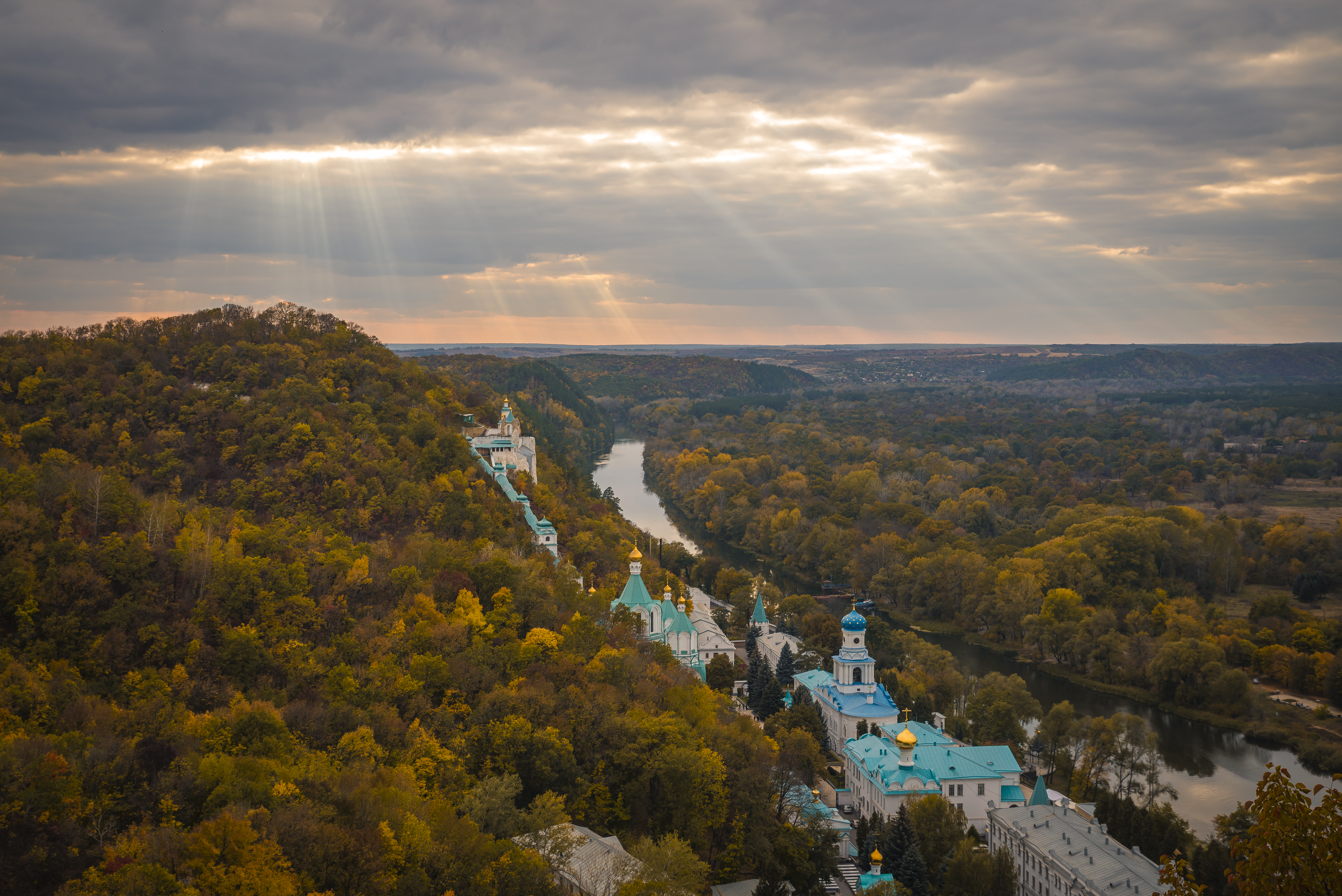
Sviatohirsk Lavra

Sviatohirsk (lit. 'Holy Mountain City') is the main religious sanctuary of the region. The Sviatohirsk Lavra is located near the city. The monastery was restored following the dissolution of the Soviet Union and the independence of Ukraine. In 2004 the monastery was granted the status of lavra. In 1997 the area around the monastery was turned into the Holy Mountains National Nature Park.

== See also ==
- Donbas Arena – Football stadium in Donetsk, Ukraine
- HC Donbass – An ice hockey team based in Donetsk bearing the name of the region
- Kryvbas – Historical region in Ukraine
- Russians in Ukraine – Ethnic minority group
