= Klivazh =

1979 Soviet underground nuclear explosion

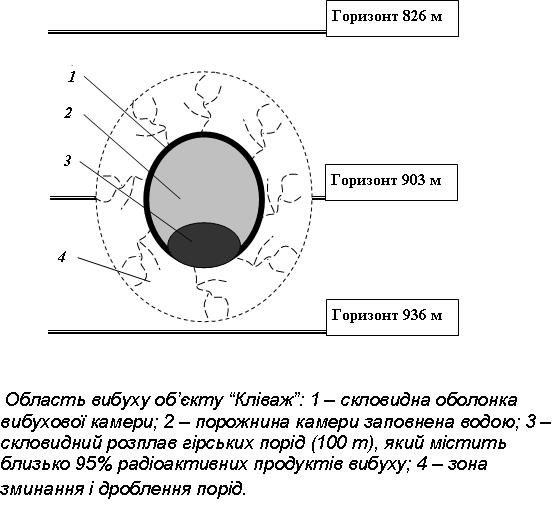
- Date: Explosion: 16 Sep 1979, Flooding: April 2018
- Time: 9:00 GMT
- Location: Yunkom coal mine, Bunhe, Yenakiieve urban hromada, Horlivka Raion, Donetsk oblast, Ukraine; 48.21336°N 38.28162°E
- Type: Peaceful Nuclear Explosion
- Outcome: The site flooded with underground waters after Russian military occupation in Russo-Ukrainian War

Klivazh is the site of an underground peaceful nuclear explosion in the Soviet program of Nuclear Explosions for the National Economy. The event took place in the Donetsk Oblast of the Ukrainian SSR on September 16, 1979. The site flooded with underground waters in 2018 after Russian military occupation during Russo-Ukrainian war, with a risk of radiological pollution of drinking water in the area.

== Details of the PNE ==
The 0.2–0.3 kt (kiloton of TNT) explosion was performed in Ukrainian SSR in an eastern annex of Yunkom coal mine, near the town of Bunhe, city of Yenakiieve, at a depth of 903 m (2,963 ft) in between the coal layers "Deviatka" (l4) and "Tsehelny" (l21) on September 16, 1979, at 9:00 AM (GMT). The aim of the explosion was to lower interlayer tension and underground gas pressure, allowing more secure coal mining. Before 1979, there were frequent rapid coal and gas outbursts in the Yunkom coal mine, and sudden squeezing-out of coal by accompanying gas evolution, as the excavating layers were situated in the tectonic tension areas. The event details were classified in the time of the USSR.

== Outcomes of the explosion ==
Following the nuclear explosion a cavity formed with a radius of 5–6 m, around it there formed a crush zone with a 20–25 m radius. The radioactivity level in the mine excavation areas and sub-surface waters remained at the natural level when the measurements were regularly conducted during 1979–2000. After the PNE the coal and gas outbursts became less frequent. In 2002, the Yunkom coal mine was closed.

== Flooding of the site ==
The danger of flooding the Yunkom coal mine was alarming for Ukrainian ecologists at the very announcement of the mine conservation as it may potentially cause radioactive pollution of the underground waters. The Ministry of Ecological Security held measures to ensure the hydrological and geological security of the site.

After the starting of Russo-Ukrainian war in 2014 the city of Yenakiieve was occupied by pro-Russian forces of Donetsk People's Republic.

In 2018 the DPR administration decided to flood the Yunkom coal mine. The drainage required maintenance of water pumps, which stopped along with the region's general infrastructure degradation after the Russian military occupation. The information was confirmed by OSCE Monitoring Mission. In April 2018 the DPR removed water pumps from the Yunkom mine, so it is gradually flooded by the natural waters. The radiological contamination was viewed as potentially spreading to the Mius River and then to the Azov Sea, threatening drinking and irrigation water supplies.

== See also ==
- Kramatorsk radiological accident
- Andreev Bay nuclear accident
