= Bungi (disambiguation) =

Bungi may refer to:

- Bungi creole, a 19th-century western Canadian creole English spoken in the Red River Colony
- Bunji, Pakistan, a town in the northern area of Pakistan
- Bungi, Indonesia, a district in Indonesia
- Bungi, a First Nations band in Ontario

== See also ==
- Bungee (disambiguation)
