= Bunhe =

City in Donetsk Oblast, Ukraine

Bunhe Бунге Yunokomunarivsk
- City
- Interactive map of Bunhe
- Location of Bunhe in Donetsk Oblast Bunhe (Ukraine)
- Coordinates: 48°13′14″N 38°16′26″E
- Country: Ukraine
- Oblast: Donetsk Oblast
- Raion: Horlivka Raion
- Hromada: Yenakiieve urban hromada
- Founded: 1908
- City rights: 1965

Population (2022)
  - Total: 13,495
- Climate: Dfb

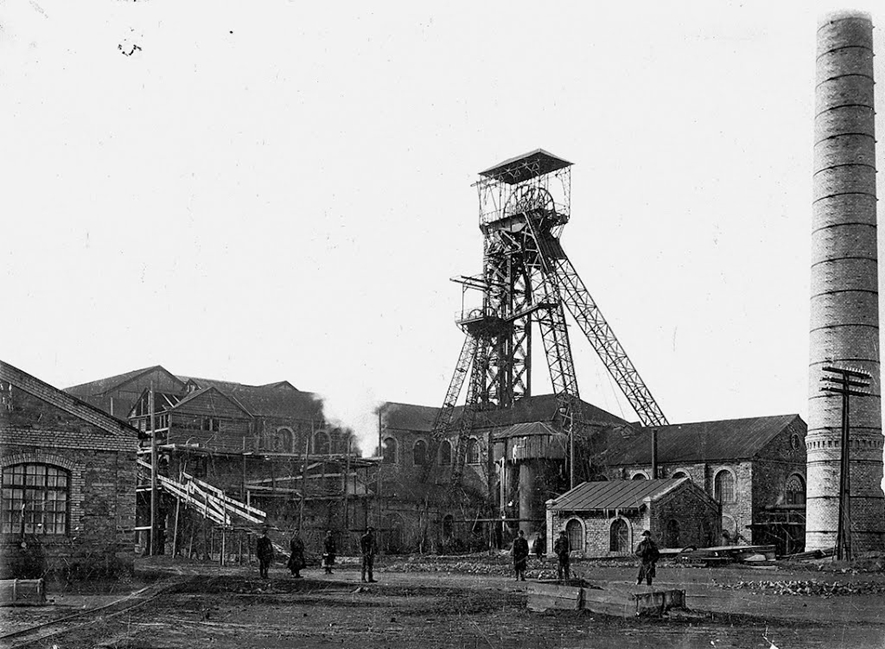

Bunhe (Ukrainian: Бунге) or Bunge (Ukrainian: Бунґе; Russian: Бунге, romanized: Bunge), also known as Yunokomunarivsk (Ukrainian: Юнокомунарівськ; Russian: Юнокоммунаровск), is a city in Yenakiieve urban hromada, Horlivka Raion, Donetsk Oblast (province) of Ukraine. Population: 13,495 (2022 estimate), 14,154 (2013 est.), 17,813 (2001).

== Geography ==
Bunge is located near the Yenakiieve railway station on the Bulavynka River (tributary of Krynka, Mius Basin). The surface is wavy, dissected by ravines and gullies. The elevation is up to 200 meters.

== History ==
It was founded in 1908 when the Russian-Belgium Metallurgical Association founded Bunge mine to supply coal to Petrovskiy steelworks (now Yenakiieve Iron and Steel Works). The name Bunhe or Bunge comes from the German surname Bunge.

In 1924, the Yunkom coal mine was named "Yunkom" ("Yuny kommunar", lit. 'Young communist') and the settlement was named "Yunokomunarivsk". In 1965 it received urban-type settlement status. On 16 September 1979, in the mine "Yuny Communar" there was one of the Nuclear Explosions for the National Economy—an object "Klivazh". In 2002 the mine was closed as non-perspective and ecologists worried about the danger of filling the mine with water. It might cause radioactive pollution of the underground water, so pumps continue to pump water out of the abandoned mine.

During the war in Donbas the city was captured by the widely unrecognized Donetsk People's Republic (DPR). On 21 September 2014 Ukrainian forces left Yunokomunarivsk.

On 12 May 2016, the Verkhovna Rada renamed Yunokomunarivsk back to its original name Bunhe (Ukrainian: Бунге or Бунґе) to conform to the law prohibiting names of Communist origin. however they couldn't enforce it on the city since it was under separatist control.

In 2018 the administration of the DPR decided to flood the Yunkom coal mine. The drainage required maintenance of water pumps, which stopped along with the region's general infrastructure degradation after the Russian military occupation. The information was confirmed by OSCE Monitoring Mission. In April 2018 the DPR removed water pumps from the Yunkom mine, so it is gradually flooded by the natural waters. The radiological contamination was viewed as potentially spreading to the Mius River and then to the Azov Sea, threatening drinking and irrigation water supplies.

In 2022 the city as well as other parts of the DPR were annexed by Russia after a mostly unrecognized referendum.

== Demographics ==
As of the Ukrainian national census in 2001, the settlement counted a population of 17,828 people. In terms of ethnicity, 55% of the population claimed to have an ethnic Russian background, which is the highest percentage recorded in any major settlement in the entire Donetsk Oblast. The second-largest group were Ukrainians, followed by Belarusians, Tatars and Azerbaijanis. The exact ethnic composition was as follows:

Ethnic groups in Bunhe
	percent
Russians	54.99%
Ukrainians	41.59%
Belarusians	1.21%
Tatars	0.31%
Azerbaijanis	0.29%
Moldovans	0.20%
Armenians	0.19%
Georgians	0.12%
Ukrainian Greeks	0.10%

Native language as of the Ukrainian Census of 2001:

First languages in Bunhe
	percent
Russian	88.45%
Ukrainian	10.84%
Belarusian	0.13%
Armenian	0.04%
Moldovan	0.02%
Polish	0.02%
German	0.01%
Hungarian	0.01%
Bulgarian	0.01%
others	0.00%
