= Bunji (given name) =

- Gender: Male
- Language: Sheena

Origin
- Origin: Sheena
- Meaning: 52 Tribes
- Region of origin: Gilgit Baltistan

Bunji is a masculine Japanese given name. Notable people with the name include:

- Bunji Garlin (born 1978), a musician from Trinidad and Tobago
- Bunji Kimura (木村 文治; born 1944), Japanese footballer and coach
- Bruce Bunji Kuwabara (born 1950), Canadian architect
- Bunji Miura (三浦 文治; 1906–1994), Japanese painter
- Bunji Okada (岡田 文次; 1874–1943), Japanese Director of the Karafuto Agency
- Okazaki Bunji, creator of Japan's first stored-program computer FUJIC
- Bunji Sakita (崎田 文二; 1930–2002), Japanese-American theoretical physicist
- Bunji Suzuki (鈴木 文治; 1885–1946), Japanese politician
- Haruo Minami (1923–2001), Japanese singer (birth name Bunji Kitazume)

== Fictional characters ==
- Bunji Kugashira, a character in the videogame Gungrave
- Bunji, a plush orange hamster-like rabbit in The Chica Show
- Bunjiro "Bunji" Bennett, a character in the animated TV series Bionic Six

== See also ==
- Bunji (disambiguation)
