= Druzhne, Horlivka Raion, Donetsk Oblast =

Urban locality in Donetsk Oblast, Ukraine

Druzhne Дружне
- Rural settlement
- Location of Druzhne within Donetsk Oblast#Location of Druzhne within Ukraine Druzhne (Ukraine)
- Coordinates: 48°11′50″N 38°17′00″E
- Country: Ukraine
- Oblast: Donetsk Oblast
- Raion: Horlivka Raion
- Elevation: 192 m (630 ft)

Population (2022)
  - Total: 676
- Time zone: UTC+2 (EET)
  - Summer (DST): UTC+3 (EEST)
- Postal code: 86498
- Area code: +380 6252

Druzhne (Ukrainian: Дружне; Russian: Дружное, romanized: Druzhnoye) is a rural settlement in Yenakiieve urban hromada, Donetsk Oblast, Ukraine. Population: 676 (2022 estimate).

== Demographics ==
Native language as of the Ukrainian Census of 2001:

- Ukrainian 3.59%
- Russian 96.41%
