= Korsun, Donetsk Oblast =

Urban locality in Donetsk Oblast, Ukraine

Korsun Корсунь
- Rural settlement
- Location of Korsun within Donetsk Oblast#Location of Korsun within Ukraine Korsun (Ukraine)
- Coordinates: 48°12′14″N 38°04′57″E
- Country: Ukraine
- Oblast: Donetsk Oblast
- Raion: Horlivka Raion
- Elevation: 148 m (486 ft)

Population (2022)
  - Total: 2,560
- Time zone: UTC+2 (EET)
  - Summer (DST): UTC+3 (EEST)
- Postal code: 86499
- Area code: +380 6252

Korsun (Ukrainian: Корсунь) is a rural settlement in Yenakiieve urban hromada, Donetsk Oblast, eastern Ukraine. Population: 2,560 (2022 estimate).

== Demographics ==
Native language as of the Ukrainian Census of 2001:

- Ukrainian 40.13%
- Russian 59.35%
- Armenian 0.29%
- Belarusian 0.06%
