= Sofiivka, Horlivka Raion, Donetsk Oblast =

Urban locality in Donetsk Oblast, Ukraine

Sofiivka Софіївка
- Rural settlement
- Location of Sofiivka within Donetsk Oblast#Location of Sofiivka within Ukraine Sofiivka (Ukraine)
- Coordinates: 48°15′37″N 38°09′34″E
- Country: Ukraine
- Oblast: Donetsk Oblast
- Raion: Horlivka Raion
- Hromada: Yenakiieve urban hromada
- Elevation: 197 m (646 ft)

Population (2022)
  - Total: 9,547
- Time zone: UTC+2 (EET)
  - Summer (DST): UTC+3 (EEST)
- Postal code: 86485-86486
- Area code: +380 6252

Sofiivka (Ukrainian: Софіївка) or Karlo-Marksove (Ukrainian: Карло-Марксове; Russian: Карло-Марксово) is a rural settlement in Yenakiieve urban hromada, Horlivka Raion, Donetsk Oblast (province) of Ukraine. Population: 9,547 (2022 estimate).

== History ==
The town was originally named "Karlo-Marksove", after the German-born political philosopher Karl Marx, but after 2014 it was renamed to Sofivka to abide by the decommunization policies in Ukraine but its effects were only de-jure since it was occupied by pro-Russian DPR separatists who do not recognize Ukraine's legitimacy over Donetsk Oblast.

In 2023 the town as well as other parts of the DPR were annexed by Russia after a mostly unrecognized referendum.

== Demographics ==
Native language as of the Ukrainian Census of 2001:

- Ukrainian 14.76%
- Russian 84.92%
- Belarusian 0.10%
- Moldovan (Romanian) and Hungarian 0.01%
