= Yenakiieve urban hromada =

Yenakiieve urban hromada Єнакієвська міська громада
- Hromada
- Interactive map of Yenakiieve urban hromada
- Country: Ukraine
- Oblast: Donetsk
- Raion: Horlivka
- Admin. center: Yenakiieve
- Settlements: 14
- Cities: 2
- Rural settlements: 2
- Villages: 7
- Towns: 3

Yenakiieve urban hromada (Ukrainian: Єнакієвська міська громада) is a prospective hromada of Ukraine, located in Horlivka Raion, Donetsk Oblast. Its administrative center is the city Yenakiieve.

The area of the hromada has been controlled by the separatist Donetsk People's Republic (and later explicitly Russia itself) since 2014, both of which continue to use the old administrative divisions of Ukraine.

The hromada contains 14 settlements: 2 cities (Yenakiieve and Bunhe), 3 urban-type settlements (Druzhne, Korsun, and Sofiivka), 7 villages:

- Avilovka
- Verkhnya Krynka
- Krynychky
- Novoselivka
- Puteprovid
- Shaposhnykove
- Shevchenko

And 2 rural-type settlements: Staropetrivske and Shchebenka.

== See also ==
- List of hromadas of Ukraine
