= Bunji-ye Karbasi =

Bunji-ye Karbasi بونجی کرباسی
- Village
- Location within Iran
- Coordinates: 25°55′10″N 57°18′29″E
- Country: Iran
- Province: Hormozgan
- County: Jask
- Bakhsh: Central
- Rural District: Kangan

Population (2006)
  - Total: 207
- Time zone: UTC+3:30 (IRST)
  - Summer (DST): UTC+4:30 (IRDT)

Bunji-ye Karbasi (Persian: بونجی کرباسی, also Romanized as Būnjī-ye Karbāsī; also known as Bonjī-ye Karbāsī) is a village in Kangan Rural District, in the Central District of Jask County, Hormozgan Province, Iran. At the 2006 census, its population was 207, in 38 families.
