= Bunji-ye Saheli Latidan =

Bunji-ye Saheli Latidan بونجي ساحلي لاتيدان
- Village
- Location within Iran
- Coordinates: 25°54′06″N 57°17′19″E
- Country: Iran
- Province: Hormozgan
- County: Jask
- Bakhsh: Central
- Rural District: Kangan

Population (2006)
  - Total: 105
- Time zone: UTC+3:30 (IRST)
  - Summer (DST): UTC+4:30 (IRDT)

Bunji-ye Saheli Latidan (Persian: بونجي ساحلي لاتيدان, also Romanized as Būnjī-ye Sāḩelī Lātīdān; also known as Bonji, Būnjī, and Būnjī-ye Sāḩelī) is a village in Kangan Rural District, in the Central District of Jask County, Hormozgan Province, Iran. At the 2006 census, its population was 105, in 19 families.
