= Yunkom coal mine =

Coal mine in eastern Ukraine

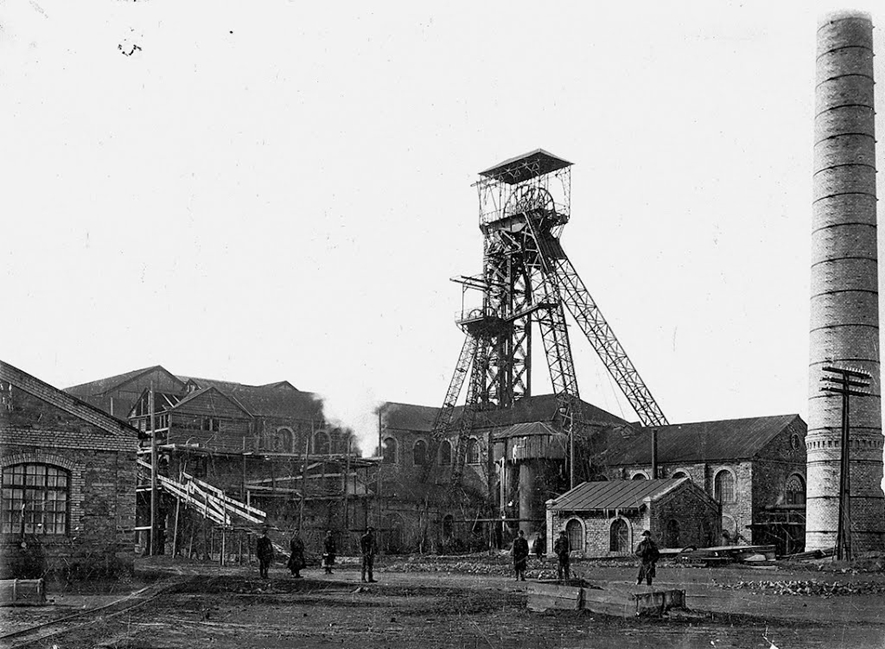
- Picture of the mine in early 20th century

- Yunkom coal mine in Ukraine Yunkom coal mine (Ukraine)
- Location: Bunhe, Donetsk Oblast, Ukraine; 48°13′41″N 38°16′26″E

Yunkom coal mine (Ukrainian: Шахта «Юнком», romanized: Shakhta "Yunkom", lit. '"Young Communist" coal mine'), officially named the Yuny Kommunar Mine, was a coal mine in the town of Bunhe in eastern Ukraine. The mine first opened in 1912, and was closed in 2018.

== History ==
This mine was first put into operation in 1912. In 1914, a jackhammer was used here for the first time.

=== Nuclear explosion ===
In 1979, Soviet authorities conducted a peaceful nuclear explosion underground at the "Klivazh" site within the Yunkom mine. This was done to prevent frequent coal and rock releases, and was conducted 903 metres (2,963 ft) below the surface.

=== Decline ===
Production significantly plummeted during the 1990s, shortly after the collapse of the Soviet Union. In 1990, the mine's production was at around 1446 t/day, which was at about 330 by 1999. The length of underground workings also fell from 84.3 kilometres (52.4 mi) in 1990 to 28.9 kilometres (18.0 mi) by 1999. The number of workers declined from 1755 people in 1990 to just 662 by 1999.

=== Flooding of the mine ===
In 2018, the administration of the self-proclaimed Donetsk People's Republic, which have controlled this mine since 2014, decided to flood the Yunkom coal mine.

== Environmental concerns ==
Following the peaceful nuclear explosion at the mine, ecologists have raised concerns over the potential dangers of flooding the Yunkom mine. According to a report by the Minister of Environmental Safety Vasyl Shevchuk, flooding the mine could lead to radioactive contamination of nearby groundwater.

This information was also confirmed by the OSCE's Special Monitoring Commission. OSCE observers provided information signaling that the DPR militants in control of the mine planned to flood the areas of the nuclear explosion. The US Department of State spokesperson, Heather Nauert, expressed concern in response to this observation in a post on Twitter. Ukrainian experts similarly warned of the large-scale environmental danger with regards to flooding the Yunkom mine.

According to hydrogeologist and doctor of technical sciences Yevgeny Yakovlev, the activity of the repository has decreased by about half in the four decades between 1979 and 2018. This is because the main products of the explosion are Cesium and Strontium, which have a half-life of about 30 years. “According to estimates, immediately after the explosion, the activity of the repository was 100 curies, now we can talk about 50 curies”. In response, Ukrainian MP Oleh Nedava urged residents in Donbas not to drink tap water, and stressed the irreversibility of radioactive contamination in the local river system.

In 2020, Mykyta Poturayev, the head of the delegation of the Verkhovna Rada to the OSCE Parliamentary Assembly, revealed during an assembly meeting in Vienna that the Yunkom has been flooded with radioactive water.

In the summer of 2024, scientists took samples from an area 5km away from the Yunkom mine. They reported that the total concentration of radionuclides in the local aquifers to be 20-34×10^{3} Bq/kg, signifying that contaminated water has reached local drinking water aquifers.
