= Bunge (surname) =

Bunge is a surname. Notable people with the surname include:

- Alexander Bunge (1803–1890), Baltic-German botanist; brother of Friedrich Georg von Bunge (1802–1897); father of Alexander von Bunge (physician) (1851–1930), and Gustav von Bunge (1844–1920)
- Alexander von Bunge (physician) (1851–1930), Baltic-German physician, zoologist, and Arctic explorer; a son of Alexander Bunge (1803–1890)
- Bettina Bunge (born 1963), German tennis player
- Delfina Bunge (1881–1952), Argentine poet and writer
- Edouard Bunge (1851–1927), Belgian businessman, banker, and philanthropist
- Friedrich Georg von Bunge (1802–1897), German legal historian; brother of Alexander Bunge (1803–1890)
- Gustav von Bunge (1844–1920), German physiologist; a son of Alexander Bunge (1803–1890)
- Mario Bunge (1919–2020), Argentine philosopher and physicist, married to Marta
- Marta Bunge (1938–2022), Argentine-Canadian mathematician, married to Mario
- Nikolay Bunge (1823–1895), Russian economist and statesman
- William Bunge (1928–2013), U.S. American geographer
