= Bungee =

Bungee may refer to:

- Bungee cord, also called shock cord, an engineered stretchable cord
  - Bungee chair, a type of office or lounge chair made with bungee cords
- Bungee jumping, an adventure sport
- Bungee language or Bungi creole, a language and its related population, which exist mainly along the north–south trade routes of Manitoba, Canada

== See also ==
- Bungie, an independent video game developer
