= Dmytro Firtash =

Ukrainian businessman (born 1965)

- Дмитро Фірташ
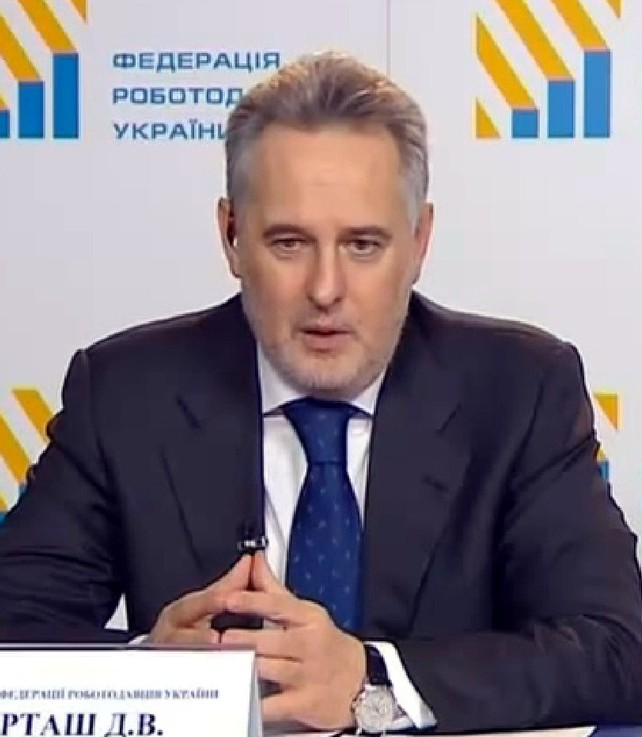
- Firtash in 2010
- Born: 2 May 1965 (age 61); Bohdanivka, Ternopil Oblast, Ukrainian SSR, Soviet Union
- Occupation: Businessman
- Website: dmitryfirtash.com

Dmytro Vasylovych Firtash (Ukrainian: Дмитро Васильович Фірташ; born 2 May 1965) is a Ukrainian businessman who heads the board of directors of Group DF. He was highly influential during the Yushchenko administration and the Yanukovych administration. As a middleman for the Russian natural gas giant Gazprom and with connections to the Kremlin, Firtash funneled money into the campaigns of pro-Russian politicians in Ukraine. Firtash obtained his position with the agreement of Russian president Vladimir Putin and, according to Firtash, Russian organized crime boss Semion Mogilevich.

His many roles during the Yushchenko administration included: presidency of the Federation of Employers of Ukraine (FEU), an interest association of industrial enterprises that he chairs; chairmanship of the National Tripartite Social and Economic Council (NTSEC); co-chairmanship of Domestic and Foreign Investors Advisory Council under the Ministry of Education, Science, Youth and Sports of Ukraine; and membership in the Committee for Economic Reforms under the President of Ukraine.

The United States Justice Department has characterized Firtash as an "upper-echelon [associate] of Russian organized crime." He was arrested by Austrian authorities in March 2014 and has since been in Vienna fighting extradition to the United States, where he is under federal indictment for an alleged bribery scheme. American attorneys Joe diGenova and Victoria Toensing, associates of then-US president Donald Trump and his personal attorney Rudy Giuliani, were hired by Firtash in July 2019 to fight his extradition, as Giuliani sought information in Ukraine to damage Democratic presidential candidate Joe Biden.

== Early life ==
Firtash was born on 2 May 1965 in Bohdanivka, Zalishchiky Raion (Ternopil Oblast), Ukraine, Soviet Union. His father Vasyl (Ukrainian: Василь) was a driver and his mother Mariya Hryhorivna (Ukrainian: Марія Григорівна) had two degrees (economics and veterinary medicine) and worked at a livestock farm and then a sugar mill as an accountant. Since the 1990s, the village has been called Synkiv.

== Business career and assets ==
Firtash began his business career almost immediately after completing his military service. He founded a trading company in Chernivtsi, Ukraine, eventually moving to Moscow in the early 1990s.

In 2007, a private international group of companies, Group DF ("the Firtash group of companies") was formed to consolidate Firtash's business assets in different sectors. Presently, Group DF incorporates assets in the chemical industry, energy sector and real estate, and this consolidation effort is still underway.

In 2008, Firtash was involved with a firm owned by Paul Manafort in a $895 million project to redevelop the Drake Hotel in New York City into a spa and luxury mall to be called Bulgari Tower. According to court records, Firtash's firm had planned to invest $100 million in the project. The deal was never finalized.

In 2010, Firtash launched an effort towards consolidation of the Ukrainian nitrogen business. From September 2010 to September 2011, Firtash acquired ownership in 'Concern STIROL' (Horlivka), 'Severodonetsk Production Association Azot' and 'Cherkassy Azot'. In just over a year, the joint marketing strategy of the four fertilizer manufacturers owned by Firtash substantially strengthened its domestic market position.

Firtash is co-owner of RosUkrEnergo and controls much of the Ukrainian titanium industry. He gained control of former state-owned titanium assets across Ukraine in 2004 and also owns several chemical plants under his Group DF which he formed in 2007. In May 2011, Firtash took over Nadra Bank (at the time Ukraine's 11th largest bank). Nadra Bank had gone into default in 2009, but it has since restructured its foreign debt with significant write-offs.

Firtash became one of the leading investors in the power sector and chemical industry in Central and Eastern Europe. His plants and companies are present in Ukraine, Germany, Italy, Cyprus, Tajikistan, Switzerland, Hungary, Austria and Estonia.

Firtash was elected President of the Joint Representative Body, a joint representative agency of employers at the national level, on 29 November 2011.

Firtash bought back 100 percent of InterInter Media Group Limited from Valeriy Khoroshkovskyi on 1 February 2013, for his GDF Media Limited. Firtash had sold various channels to Khoroshkovskyi's U.A. Inter Media Group Ltd in June 2007 while consolidating other business interests. Firtash owns seven television channels as well as an influential Kyiv-based Ukrainian News Agency. Firtash is also cited as having part ownership of SCL Group and thus Cambridge Analytica through various shell companies, by the U.S. documentary Active Measures, in its breakdown of the Russian–U.S. relationship before and after the 2016 election.

In April 2014, Firtash stated that despite the difficult conditions of doing business during Ukraine's political crisis, Ostchem enterprises, part of Ostchem Holding The investments directed to the development and modernization of Ostchem enterprises allowed significant increases in the production capacities of Rivne Azot, Stirol Concern, and Crimea soda plant in the first quarter of 2014.

In February 2014, the British Ministry of Defence sold the disused Brompton Road tube station to Firtash, who planned to convert the site into residential flats. As of August 2017, the property remained undeveloped because (according to his lawyer) Firtash "could not travel from Vienna to London due to a U.S. extradition request."

On 18 June 2021 the National Security and Defense Council of Ukraine imposed sanctions against Firtash because allegedly his titanium business aided the "military-industrial complex of the Russian Federation."

On 4 August 2021 the previously Firtash-owned Zaporizhzhia Titanium-Magnesium Plant was returned to state ownership. The Commercial Court of Zaporizhzhia Oblast ruled that Firtash had not fulfilled its 2013 obligations to the State Property Fund of Ukraine to invest 110 million US dollars in the modernization of the plant.

At the end of May 2022 26 Ukrainian regional natural gas distribution companies, most of which were controlled by Firtash, were transferred to the management of a daughter company of Naftogaz. (Prior to this transfer) Firtash's regional distribution companies delivered 70% of natural gas to its customers in Ukraine.

== Business development initiatives ==
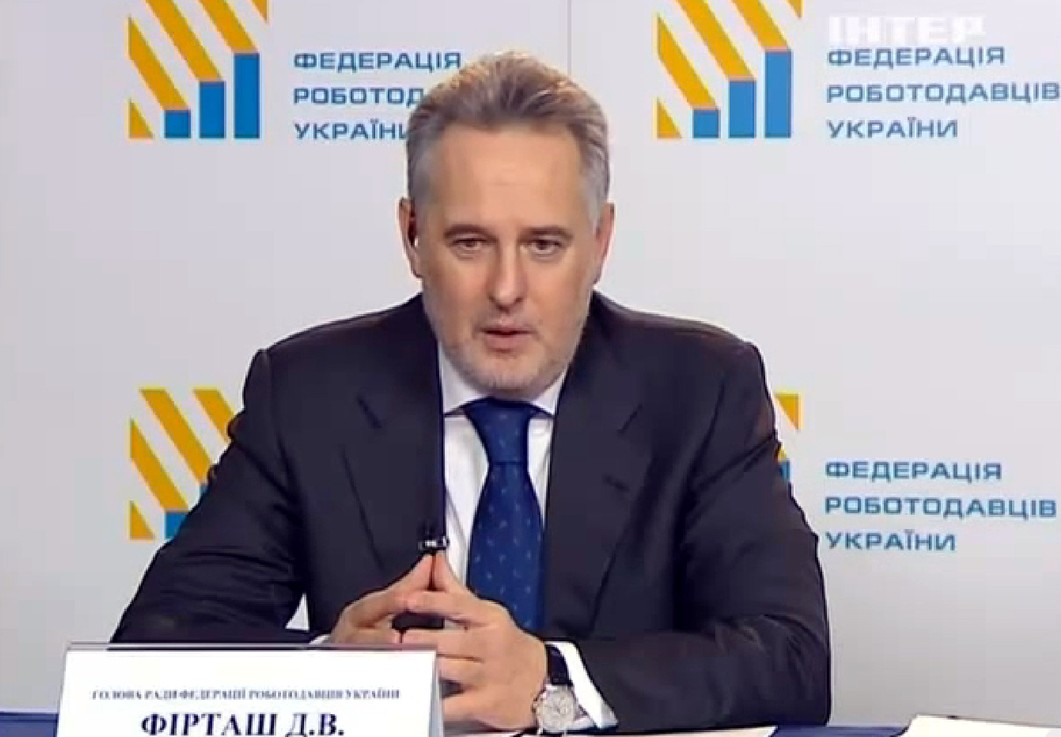
Firtash united Ukrainian employers

Firtash unified the employers' organizations of Ukraine into a single powerful association, the Federation of Employers of Ukraine (FEU), which he presided over from November 2011 to September 2016. The FEU membership includes companies and enterprises collectively generating 70 percent of Ukraine's GDP. It represents employers' interests in the economic, social and labor relations with the government and trade unions at the national level.

In 2012, Firtash initiated the establishment of a venture investment fund, Bukovina, aimed at supporting small enterprises. It has become Ukraine's first investment fund offering preferential lending support to small businesses in all sectors of the economy.

In October 2013, Firtash was introduced into the state commission of cooperation with the World Trade Organization by the President of Ukraine, Viktor Yanukovych.

== Politics ==
In spring 2002, Firtash ran for parliament as a member of the all-Ukrainian political association Women for the Future, under the patronage of Lyudmila Kuchma, a wife of Ukrainian President Leonid Kuchma. The party won 2.11% of the vote, below the 3% threshold required for representation in the Ukrainian parliament. In 2010, Firtash was involved in financing Viktor Yanukovych's presidential campaign. Firtash stated that he sincerely believed that Yanukovych would learn from the events of 2003–2004 and adopt different policies. Since 2011, they have been at odds on questions of public policy. In 2011, Firtash said that Yushchenko had planned good reforms, but Prime Minister Yulia Tymoshenko had not allowed him to implement them.

In March 2014, on behalf of the business circles of Ukraine, Firtash addressed Aleksandr Shokhin, the Head of the Russian Union of Industrialists and Entrepreneurs, and the wider business community concerning the situation in the political arena and urged Russian businessmen to stop the war between Russia and Ukraine.

On 3 April 2014, Firtash announced that he hoped the forthcoming presidential elections would overcome the chaos in Ukraine and strengthen the country on the international political scene. He said: "I will not allow for my reputation to be ruined by those who are driven by political motivations and are not interested in Ukraine and its people". On 11 April 2014, he urged big Ukrainian business to act according to the logic of "economic patriotism" and buy up goods in domestic companies.

A profile piece published about Firtash by the BBC on 30 April 2014, stated that because he acted as a go-between in the gas trade between Turkmenistan and Ukraine, Yulia Tymoshenko, Ukraine prime minister at the time made hostile attempts to push Firtash and his firm out of Ukraine-Russia gas control negotiations in 2009.

In an interview given to the BBC in May 2014, Firtash protested his innocence, denied paying bribes and any links to organized crime. He reiterated his belief that he is a pawn in the geo-political struggle between the United States and Russia.

In September 2016, after serving as president of the FEU for five years, Firtash resigned the position of the FEU President.

While in Austria fighting extradition to the U.S., Firtash gave an interview to his own Inter TV channel in which he called for Ukrainian business to unite in support of the state to help it to overcome the economic crises. He also promised to provide funds to support the Ukrainian army. In April, Ostchem enterprises, part of Firtash's group of companies, began supporting Ukraine's military forces.

== Charity ==
As of 2014 Firtash was one of Ukraine's largest philanthropists per Top-Ukraine.com, providing systemic support to education, theaters, museums, historical, cultural and humanitarian projects and as of 2011, to science,

In 2008, the University of Cambridge in the UK established a Cambridge Ukrainian Studies program with his financial support. In 2012, another charity initiative by Firtash enabled the establishment of Cambridge–Ukraine studentships, that made it possible for eligible students from Ukraine to seek a master's degree at the University of Cambridge. As of 2014, Firtash has been a member of the Guild of Cambridge Benefactors, which recognizes major benefactors of over £1 million to the University and Cambridge Colleges. After Firtash's arrest, human rights organizations criticized the university for accepting the funds.

In 2014, Firtash financed the construction of the Ukrainian Catholic University campus in the city of Lviv.

In 2011, Firtash made a sizable contribution to construction of the Holy Trinity Cathedral at the Holy Ascension Monastery in the village of Bancheny, Chernivtsi region. His support was recognized by Patriarch Kirill of Moscow who awarded Firtash with the Order of Venerable Serafim of Sarov, 2nd Degree.

== Controversy ==
As of 2011, Firtash has been a controversial figure in Ukraine.

In April 2005, Oleksandr Turchynov, the head of Ukraine's Security Service of Ukraine (SBU), explained to the Financial Times that Semion Mogilevich was associated with RosUkrEnergo after SBU had collected a 20 volume file on Mogilevich over a twelve-year period. In 2006, an ally of Tymoshenko stated in the Rada that Firtash's Swiss-registered RosUkrEnergo, which has been the dominant natural gas supplier to Ukraine since 2003, replacing the Hungarian-registered Eural Trans Gas, which replaced Itera beginning in late 2002, had Semion Mogilevich as a silent partner. In an April 2006 Financial Times interview, Firtash explained his relationships with various holding companies after Firtash's bank Raiffeisen hired Kroll, Inc. to investigate connections to Mogilevich. According to documents uncovered in 2010 during the United States diplomatic cables leak, Firtash in 2008 had told U.S. Ambassador to Ukraine William Taylor of needing permission from alleged Russian crime boss Semion Mogilevich to do business in Ukraine during the lawless 1990s. The same documents suggest that Firtash also claimed to be friends with President Viktor Yushchenko. Firtash denied the remarks. Allegedly, Gazprom, a Russian natural-gas extraction company, had asked Mogilevich to oversee natural-gas deliveries from Russia to Ukraine via gas intermediary RosUkrEnergo. All parties denied connections with Mogilevich. Other cables said Firtash and Mogilevich were linked through offshore companies either by joint ownership through former spouses or through Firtash-headed companies in which Mogilevich's former spouse was the shareholder. As of 2010, it was also suspected that Raiffeisen Bank International, an Austrian-based bank, was a front to legitimize RosUkrEnergo.

On 15 June 2005, after the Security Service of Ukraine started an investigation by Oleksander Turchynov in May 2005, Tymoshenko charged that Firtash and his Nicosia, Cyprus based Highrock Holdings had been central to over $1 billion stolen from Ukraine through his Turkmenistan gas scheme involving both Eural Trans Gas and RosUkrEnergo. On 8 September 2005, Yushchenko dismissed Tymoshenko and subsequently, on 23 September 2005, the SBU investigation into the missing money was halted by direct order of Yushchenko according to Turchynov.

On 16 June 2009, Yulia Tymoshenko accused the other candidates in the 2010 Ukrainian presidential election – Viktor Yushchenko, Arseniy Yatseniuk and Viktor Yanukovych – of sharing a single campaign headquarters financed by Firtash. She accused Firtash, who is a key contributor to Yanukovych, of fraudulently using New York real estate through which to launder money from Ukraine through the United States and then back to Ukraine to support various corrupt political activities and politicians. On 26 April 2011, Tymoshenko sued Firtash and RosUkrEnergo in a U.S. District Court in Manhattan, accusing them of manipulating an arbitration court ruling in Stockholm – the ruling had ordered Ukraine's state energy company, Naftogaz, to pay RosUkrEnergo 11 billion cubic meters of natural gas to compensate for fuel it had "expropriated" plus 1.1 billion cubic meters of gas as a penalty. She claimed in court that Firtash had money laundered revenues from gas to support pro-Kremlin and pro-Putin candidates and officials in Ukraine associated with Yanukovych's political party. Both Firtash and RosUkrEnergo officials denied the allegations and a U.S. judge dismissed the lawsuits in September 2015.

As of 2011, Firtash and influential multi-time Minister Yuriy Boiko were alleged to be "close associates".

As of 2012, analysts and Ukrainian politicians believed that Firtash was a secret force behind the sentencing of Yulia Tymoshenko in 2011, either for revenge or to hinder Ukraine's European Union integration for personal financial gain. Firtash was accused in a New York court of "masterminding" Tymoshenko's imprisonment; the case was dismissed in March 2013.

In the 2012 Ukrainian parliamentary election, Firtash was perceived as being one of Ukrainian Democratic Alliance for Reform's (UDAR) main sponsors. This has been denied by UDAR.

On 23 July 2013, brothers Ilya and Vadim Segal, the New York-based owners of Dancroft Holdings, brought charges in New York County Supreme Court against Firtash and Nadra Bank, then Ukraine's eighth-largest bank. The suit accused Firtash, the bank's owner, of seizing their assets via "sham lawsuits" over debt, and of using his connections with President Viktor Yanukovich to guarantee the outcomes in court cases. The suit stated that the former head of the Security Service of Ukraine (SBU), Valeriy Khoroshkovskyi, is a business partner of Firtash, together with head of the presidential administration, Serhiy Lyovochkin, and former Ukrainian energy minister, Deputy Prime Minister, Yuriy Boiko. According to the complaint, the SBU, in bringing charges against the Segals, was acting on behalf of Firtash.

As of 2017, links between Firtash, Paul Manafort and President Trump's administration continued to make headlines with reports that the extradition case will test U.S.-Russia relations.

In 2014, a special report by Reuters documented that Gazprom sold more than 20 billion cubic metres of gas at below market prices, enabling Firtash to make up to $3 billion during the deal. The report also notes the release of documents that proved Putin extended credit lines to Firtash of up to $11 billion which helped Firtash extend influence during the 2010 presidential election in Ukraine.

In 2017, United States prosecutors filed suits alleging that Firtash was involved in bribery supporting upper echelon Russian mafia.

=== Involvement in Trump–Ukraine scandal ===
Living in Vienna, Austria since 2014, Firtash has been resisting extradition to the United States on bribery and racketeering charges, and had sought to have the charges dropped. Firtash's attorneys obtained a September 2019 statement from Viktor Shokin, the former Ukrainian prosecutor general who was forced out under pressure from multiple countries and non-governmental organizations, as conveyed to Ukraine by then-vice president Joe Biden. Shokin asserted in the statement that Biden actually had him fired because he refused to stop his investigation into Burisma, a Ukrainian energy firm that employed Biden's son Hunter. President Donald Trump's personal attorney, Rudy Giuliani, who asserts he has "nothing to do with Firtash," has promoted the statement in television appearances as purported evidence of wrongdoing by the Bidens.

Although Lanny Davis represented Firtash until July 2019, Firtash was represented by Trump and Giuliani associates Joseph diGenova and his wife Victoria Toensing, having hired them on the recommendation of Giuliani associate Lev Parnas. The New York Times reported in November that Giuliani had directed Parnas to approach Firtash with the proposition that Firtash could help to provide compromising information on Biden, which Parnas's attorney described was "part of any potential resolution to [Firtash's] extradition matter." Shokin's statement notes that it was prepared "at the request of lawyers acting for Dmitry Firtash." Bloomberg News reported on October 18 that during the summer of 2019 Firtash associates began attempting to dig up dirt on the Bidens in an effort to solicit Giuliani's assistance with Firtash's legal matters, as well as hiring diGenova and Toensing in July. Bloomberg also reported that its sources told them Giuliani's high-profile publicity of the Shokin statement had greatly reduced the chances of the Justice Department dropping the charges against Firtash, as it would appear to be a political quid pro quo.

Later that day, The New York Times reported that weeks earlier, before his associates Lev Parnas and Igor Fruman were indicted, Giuliani met with officials with the criminal and fraud divisions of the Justice Department regarding what Giuliani characterized as a "very, very sensitive" foreign bribery case involving a client of his. The Times did not name whom the case involved, but shortly after publication of the story Giuliani told a reporter it was not Firtash. Two days later, the Justice Department stated its officials would not have met with Giuliani had they known his associates were under investigation by the SDNY. diGenova has said he has known attorney general Bill Barr for thirty years, as they both worked in the Reagan Justice Department. The Washington Post reported on October 22 that after they began representing Firtash, Toensing and diGenova secured a rare face-to-face meeting with Barr to argue the Firtash charges should be dropped. Prior to that mid-August meeting, Barr had been briefed in detail on the initial whistleblower complaint within the CIA that had been forwarded to the Justice Department, as well as on Giuliani's activities in Ukraine. Barr declined to intervene in the Firtash case.

Firtash made his fortune brokering Ukrainian imports of natural gas from the Russian firm Gazprom. As vice president, Joe Biden had urged the Ukrainian government to eliminate middlemen such as Firtash from the country's natural gas industry, and to reduce the country's reliance on imports of Russian natural gas. Firtash denied involvement in collecting or financing damaging information on the Bidens.

Vladislav Davidzon (Note: Vladislav Davidzon (born Tashkent, Uzbekistan) is the son of Gregory Davidzon an October 1990 immigrant to Brooklyn from Tashkent, Uzbekistan and, through his Davidzon Radio, an influential member of the Brighton Beach community known as Little Russia.) stated that Andrii Telizhenko (Note: Andrii Telizhenko (Ukrainian: Андрій Теліженко; born 1990), a former Ukrainian diplomat at the Ukrainian Embassy in Washington, D.C., was a contractor for the public affairs firm Blue Star Strategies which had worked for Burisma Holdings. He is close to Rudy Giuliani. In January 2021, Telizhenko was sanctioned due to his role in the 2020 pro-Trump disinformation campaign associated with Andrii Derkach and Rudy Giuliani.) is close to Firtash and acts as Firtash's go between.

=== U.S. extradition request, 2014 ===
On 13 March 2014, Austrian authorities arrested Firtash. U.S. law enforcement authorities sought to have Firtash extradited after a judge in Virginia issued a warrant for his arrest on bribery and other charges. A week later, Firtash was released on bail of €125 million (£105m, $172m), the largest in Austrian history. He said: "thankfully, I have the utmost confidence in the Austrian judicial system and will use all legal means to prove my innocence". He said U.S. authorities were making allegations that were "completely absurd and unfounded". In April 2014, a U.S. grand jury in Chicago indicted Firtash and five others under the Foreign Corrupt Practices Act on charges that included bribery, racketeering, and money laundering. The charges centered on a $18.5 million bribe offered to government officials in India related to titanium mining licenses, with the minerals destined for sale to Chicago-based Boeing. (Note: The indictments were issued in June 2013 but sealed until April 2014.)

In June 2019, extradition of Firtash was cleared by the Austrian Supreme Court and by Austrian Minister of Justice Clemens Jabloner in July 2019. But as of July 2019, Firtash's defense team suspended his extradition.

==== Denial of U.S. extradition and attempted return to Ukraine, 2015 ====
On 30 April 2015, the Vienna Regional Criminal Court rejected the U.S. request for the extradition of Firtash. Judge Christoph Bauer said that the request for extradition was "politically motivated". Bauer said that in the year since Firtash's arrest in Vienna, the U.S. authorities had not provided sufficient evidence that Firtash paid bribes in India, and in particular had not provided witness statements in support of its assertions. During the proceedings, Bauer had said that he did not doubt the veracity of the Americans' witnesses so much as whether they existed at all. A New York Times reporter described the decision as a "scathing rebuke of the Justice and State Departments", reflecting the diminished credibility of the United States authorities in the eyes of a European ally.

On 25 November 2015, German media reported that Firtash could return to Ukraine and participate in the FEU on 2 December. On 26 November, a spokesman for the Interior Ministry of Ukraine, Artem Shevchenko, said that the Interior Ministry had no criminal proceedings against Firtash, but there was a proceeding for the Ostchem group in which he was summoned as a witness.

On 28 November 2015, the head of the Ukrainian airspace administration instructed that airspace be closed to private aircraft, to prevent Firtash from returning.

==== Court of Appeal ruling on U.S. extradition, 2017 ====
On 21 February 2017, the High Regional Court of Vienna (Oberlandesgericht Wien) reviewed the appeal and ruled that it was allowed to extradite Firtash to the U.S. The final decision on the extradition was deferred to the Federal Minister of Justice of Austria.

Judge Leo Levnaic-Iwanski noted that U.S. authorities had provided additional documentation since the lower court had ruled against them. Firtash faces up to 50 years in prison and the seizure of all his assets. Immediately following the verdict, Firtash was arrested on a Spanish arrest warrant related to charges of money laundering.

==== Reopening of the proceedings, 2023 ====
In June 2023 the Oberlandesgericht Wien ruled in favor of Firtash's complaint regarding the previous rejection of his application for the resumption of proceedings. "This means that the extradition proceedings pending before the Vienna Regional Court for Criminal Matters initiated by the USA in 2014 are back to square one."

In November 2024 the Landesgericht Wien decided that an extradition to the US was not permissible, while the Vienna Public Prosecutor’s Office (Staatsanwaltschaft Wien) prepared to appeal the decision. In 2025, after 11 years of proceedings, the Vienna Court of Appeals definitively ruled against the extradition of Ukrainian businessman Dmytro Firtash to the United States.

==== Detention on Spanish and American orders, 2016 ====
On 21 February 2017, a few minutes after the announcement of the High Court's decision, Austrian police detained Firtash at the courthouse on the basis of an EU arrest warrant issued by Spain. The Spanish warrant was issued as part of an investigation into money laundering. The prosecutor's office in Vienna detained Firtash for 48 hours to determine its course of action.

On 23 February 2017 Firtash was released from custody on the €125 million bail deposited in 2014. However, that same day he was arrested and held in custody in connection with the U.S. extradition request.

On 24 February, Vienna Regional Court dismissed the Vienna prosecutor's application to impose provisional detention pending surrender regarding the U.S. extradition case. The question where Firtash was to be extradited – to Spain or the United States – is in the jurisdiction of the Minister of Justice of Austria, Wolfgang Brandstetter.

In early September 2017, Yevhen Yenin, Deputy Prosecutor General of Ukraine, noted that Firtash's return to Ukraine was "an unrealistic event". Proceedings to hear extradition cases from the United States and Spain would be lengthy. Yenin also noted, "there is a political side to the case. If we consider the level of Firtash's defense, it includes Austria's former justice minister."

In September 2017, anti-corruption groups including Human Rights Watch, proposed that Firtash be placed on the Magnitsky List and sanctioned by the United States government.

On 19 December 2017, Vienna's Higher Regional Court cited insufficient documentation linking Firtash to alleged money laundering and organized crime: it decided against extraditing Firtash from Austria to Spain.

== UK sanctions ==
The UK government has imposed sanctions on Ukrainian oligarch Dmytro Firtash, Angolan billionaire Isabel dos Santos, and Latvian politician Aivars Lembergs as part of an anti-corruption initiative targeting global corruption and "dirty money". The sanctions include freezing their assets, with Firtash being accused of laundering hundreds of millions of pounds from Ukraine and investing the proceeds in UK property. His wife, Lada Firtash, has also been sanctioned for allegedly profiting from his corruption and holding UK assets on his behalf. Representatives of Firtash strongly criticized the decision.

== Personal life ==
Firtash was married to his first wife Liudmila Grabovetskaya (Ukrainian: Людмила Грабовецька) and they have a daughter Ivanna (Ukrainian: Іванна) (b. 1988).

He was married to his second wife, Maria Kalynovskaya (Ukrainian: Марія Калиновська), from 2001 until 2006. His stepson, Serhiy Kalynovsky (Ukrainian: Сергій Калиновський), fled Ukraine in September 2007 after he was involved in a traffic accident on 30 May 2007 in which the driver and the passenger of a parked vehicle were killed. Kalynovsky was charged with their deaths and is on an international wanted list.

As of 2016, Firtash's wife Lada Pavlivna Firtasha (Ukrainian: Лада Павлівна Фірташа) were Russian citizens and, as of April 2016, they all resided in Moscow.

As of 2016, his oldest daughter and her mother Maria are Ukrainian citizens.

In 2005, through LM Holdings of Nice and later the Irish firm Moraga Ltd, he acquired the Villa La Mauresque near Cap Ferrat, Saint-Jean-Cap-Ferrat on the Cote d'Azur of France.

== See also ==
- Group DF
- Joseph diGenova and Victoria Toensing
- Federation of Employers of Ukraine
- Nadra Bank
- Ostchem Holding
- RosUkrEnergo
- Trump–Ukraine scandal
