= Petro Zyma =

Ukrainian government official

- Петро Зима

Chief of the Security Service of Ukraine in Sevastopol
- In office 12 October 2012 – 3 March 2014

Personal details
- Born: Petro Anatoliyovich Zima; 18 January 1970 (age 56) Artemivsk, Donetsk Oblast, Ukraine, Soviet Union
- Citizenship: Ukraine (until 2014); Russia (since 2014)
- Occupation: Security officer of the SBU

Colonel Petro Anatoliyvich Zyma (Ukrainian: Петро Анатолійович Зима; born on 18 January 1970), is a government official who served as a chief of the Security Service of Ukraine in Sevastopol from 2012 until the Russian annexation of Crimea in February 2014.

On 3 March, he was officially dismissed by acting President Oleksandr Turchynov, thus immediately defecting to Russia, becoming an employee of the Federal Security Service, as of 2015.

Besides being accused of treason, Zyma is under suspicion of involvement in killing civilians during the Euromaidan events in February 2014.

== Sanctions ==
He is sanctioned primarily by the European Union, the United States, Canada in 2014, and later by Ukraine in 2021.
