= RosUkrEnergo =

Natural gas company

RosUkrEnergo is a Swiss-registered venture company that transports natural gas from Turkmenistan to East European countries. 50% of the company is owned by Gazprom, through its subsidiary Swiss-registered Rosgas Holding A.G., and another 50% by Swiss-registered private company Centragas Holding A.G., acting on behalf of a consortium of GDF Group owned by Dmytro Firtash and Ivan Fursin.

Before the 2009 Russia–Ukraine gas dispute, it was the sole importer of natural gas from Gazprom, reselling it to Naftogaz Ukrainy. Critics have questioned Gazprom's claimed need for RUE as a middleman. RUE has been accused of simply being “a corrupt intermediary” but has dismissed suggestions that Russian or Ukrainian politicians benefit from the arrangement.

== History ==
The company was created in July 2004 in a deal by former Ukrainian President Leonid Kuchma and his Russian counterpart Vladimir Putin to replace Eural Trans Gas. Until 2006 the company acted as a middleman between Turkmenistan and Ukraine. The company also sells Turkmenistan gas to Poland. Due to an agreement between Gazprom and Naftogaz, from 2006 till January 2009 the company supplied all of Ukraine's natural gas imports from Russia and other Central Asian countries, in addition to Turkmenistan and Uzbekistan. On October 24, 2008 Gazprom and Ukraine's national energy company Naftogaz signed a long-term cooperation deal in which was stated that Ukraine will receive Russian natural gas directly from Gazprom and Naftogaz will be the sole importer of Russian natural gas.

After weeks of disputes the head of Gazprom Alexei Miller and the head of Naftogaz Ukrainy Oleh Dubyna signed the 10-year agreement on natural gas supplies to Ukraine for the period of 2009–2019 on 19 January 2009. It was agreed that RosUkrEnergo will no longer supply all of Ukraine's natural gas imports from Russia and other Central Asian countries. A claim of a $600 million debt of Naftohaz to RosUkrEnergo was also dropped.

On March 4, 2009, Officers of the Security Service of Ukraine (SBU) and the Alfa special police unit searched the headquarters of Naftohaz Ukrainy in a case against officials of Naftohaz Ukrainy on embezzlement of 6.3 billion cubic meters of transit natural gas, according to Valerii Khoroshkovskyi, first deputy chairman of the Security Service of Ukraine, the RosUkrEnergo Company and a number of Verkhovna Rada's deputies had filed in a claim against Naftohaz Ukrainy. On March 17, 2009, a criminal case was filed against officials of the Naftohaz Ukrainy national joint-stock company on suspicion of stealing 6.3 billion cubic meters of natural gas intended for transit through Ukraine by the SBU.

On March 30, 2010, an international arbitration court in Stockholm ordered Naftohas Ukrainy to pay RosUkrEnergo around $200 million as a penalty for various breaches of supply, transit and storage contracts. On June 8, 2010, the Stockholm Arbitration Tribunal ordered Naftohaz to return 11 bcm of natural gas to RosUkrEnergo and that RosUkrEnergo would receive from Naftohaz a further 1.1 bcm of natural gas in lieu of RosUkrEnergo's entitlement to penalties for breach of contract. On April 26, 2011, former Ukrainian Prime Minister Yulia Tymoshenko sued Dmytro Firtash and RosUkrEnergo in a U.S. District Court in Manhattan accusing them of "defrauding Ukraine's citizenry" by manipulating an arbitration court ruling, "undermining the rule of law in Ukraine" in connection with the 2010 international arbitration court ruling in Stockholm.

== Eural Trans Gas ==
Eural Trans Gas (ETG) was an energy company registered in Budapest, Hungary, on December 6, 2002. It was suspected of acting as a Gazprom front. Andras Knopp, a former Hungarian communist cultural functionary with no knowledge of the gas business, became director of the company. The registered owner was Dmytro Firtash, an obscure Ukrainian national who reportedly had little if any known assets. Yet the person received almost $300 million in credits from Russian banks.

ETG maintained an account at a Budapest branch of Vienna's Raiffeisen Bank International and had a number of accounts in Vienna's Meinl Bank.

== Owners and allegations of criminal connections ==
In April 2005, Oleksandr Turchynov, the head of Ukraine's SBU, explained to the Financial Times that Semion Mogilevich is associated with RosUkrEnergo after the SBU had collected a 20 volume file on Mogilevich over a twelve-year period. In 2006, an ally of Tymoshenko stated in the Rada that Firtash's Switzerland registered RosUkrEnergo, which has been the dominant natural gas supplier to Ukraine since 2003 after it replaced the Hungarian registered Eural Trans Gas which had replaced Itera in December 2002, has Semion Mogilevich, who has many Russian mafia associates, as a silent partner. In an April 2006 Financial Times interview, Firtash explained relationships with various holding companies after Firtash's bank Raiffeisen hired Kroll, Inc. to investigate connections to Mogilevich.

Former Ukrainian prime-pinister Yulia Tymoshenko stated in November 2006, the company is controlled by notorious Ukrainian-born Russian mafia boss Semion Mogilevich, while in 2009 Vladimir Putin was quoted as claiming that RosUkrEnergo is owned by a business ally of Viktor Yushchenko. The Ukrainian investigation into RosUkrEnergo begun during Tymoshenko's previous term as prime minister was closed after she lost her position as prime minister in September 2005. According to a document uncovered during the United States diplomatic cables leak US-diplomats shared Tymoshenko's suspicions.

In April 2006, London-based corruption watchdog Global Witness published a report focusing on RosUkrEnergo and other transit companies that have acted as intermediaries between Turkmenistan, Russia and Ukraine. The report highlighted the many links in personnel between RosUkrEnergo and the previous intermediary Eural Trans Gas. According to the report, Israeli lawyer Zeev Gordon had registered Eural Trans Gas on behalf of Ukrainian businessman Dmytro Firtash. Also in late April 2006, Izvestia reported that the primary shareholder of RosUkrEnergo is Dmytro Firtash. The report stated that he owned 90% of CentraGas Holding, equaling 45% of RosUkrEnergo. The report stated that a further owner is another Ukrainian businessman Ivan Fursin, the primary shareholder of the Odesa Film Studio and an owner of Misto-bank. His stake was revealed to be 10% of CentraGas and therefore a 5% owner of RosUkrEnergo.

== Profits ==
RosUkrEnergo reported a 2005 profit of $755 million and paid $735 million in dividends.

The company's 2006 profit is listed at over $785 million.

RosUkrEnergo profit for January–September 2007 is reported at $213 million.

The company makes its profit on re-exporting gas to Europe. The size of the profit is defined by Gazprom through the export allowances of about 9 billion cubic meters a year. RosUkrEnergo supplies gas to the Hungarian gas distributor Emfesz, for example, which is also controlled by Firtash via his holding company Group DF.

Effectively, by engaging in this supply scheme Gazprom transfers profits from its shareholders to the shareholders of RosUkrEnergo.

== See also ==
- Russia-Ukraine gas dispute
- List of Gazprom subsidiaries
