= Russia–Ukraine gas disputes =

Disputes between Naftogaz Ukrayiny and Gazprom

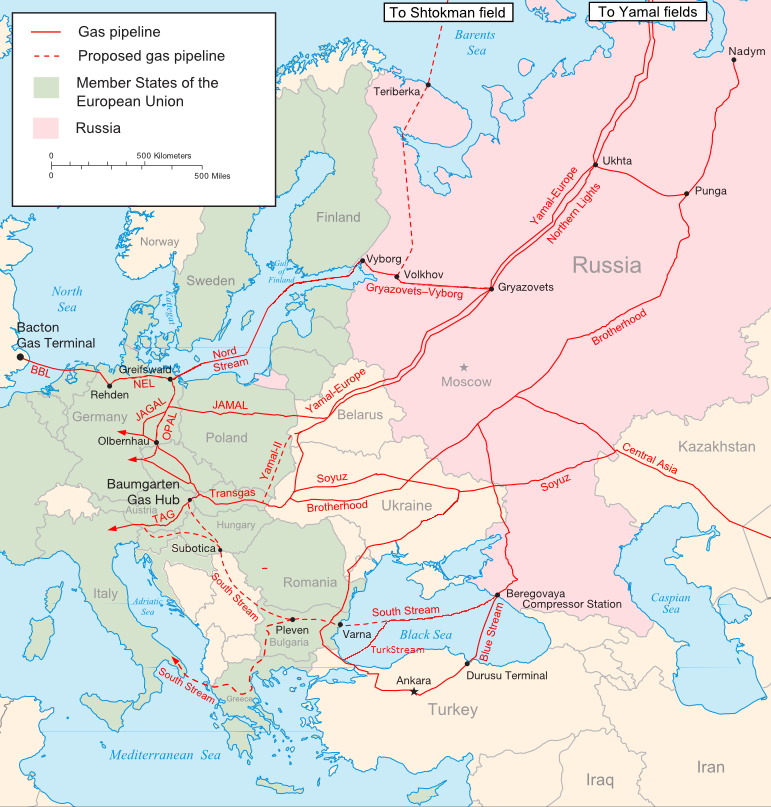
Natural gas pipelines from Russia to Europe as of March 2021

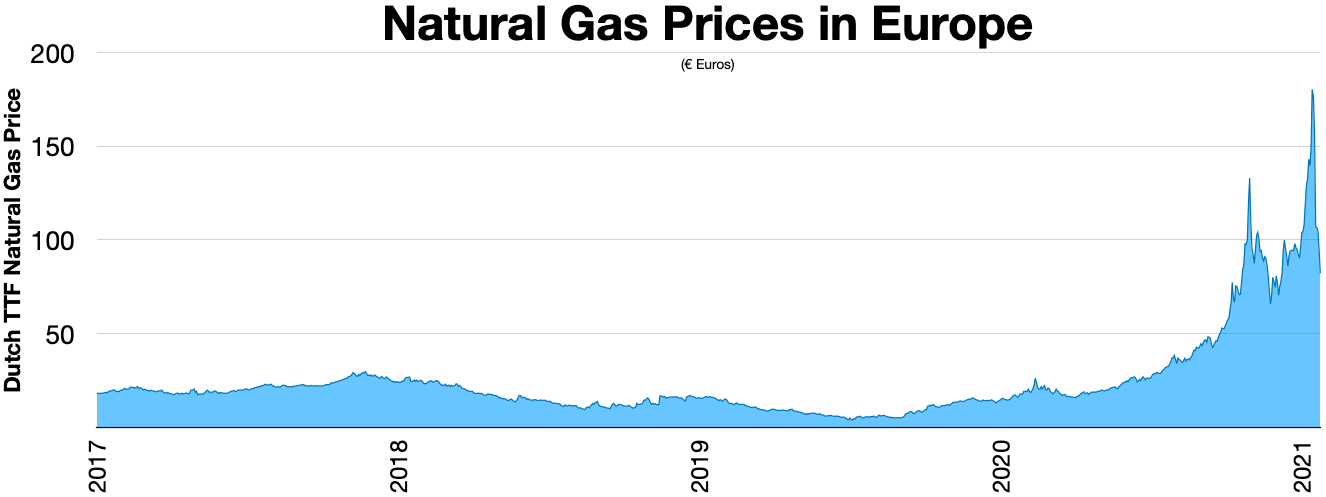
The EU natural gas price

The Russia–Ukraine gas disputes refer to a number of disputes between Ukrainian oil and gas company Naftogaz Ukrayiny and Russian gas supplier Gazprom over natural gas supplies, prices, and debts. These disputes have grown beyond simple business disputes into transnational political issues—involving political leaders from several countries—that threaten natural gas supplies in numerous European countries dependent on natural gas imports from Russian suppliers, which are transported through Ukraine. Russia provides approximately a quarter of the natural gas consumed in the European Union; approximately 80% of those exports travel through pipelines across Ukrainian soil prior to arriving in the EU.

A serious dispute began in March 2005 over the price of natural gas supplied and the cost of transit. During this conflict, Russia claimed Ukraine was not paying for gas, but diverting that which was intended to be exported to the EU from the pipelines. Ukrainian officials at first denied the accusation, but later Naftogaz admitted that because of harsh winter (lower than minus 30C) some natural gas intended for other European countries was retained and used for domestic needs. Ukraine said it will still meet its contractual transit obligations. The dispute reached a high point on 1 January 2006, when Russia cut off all gas supplies passing through Ukrainian territory. On 4 January 2006, a preliminary agreement between Russia and Ukraine was achieved, and the supply was restored. The situation calmed until October 2007 when new disputes began over Ukrainian gas debts. This led to reduction of gas supplies in March 2008. During the last months of 2008, relations once again became tense when Ukraine and Russia could not agree on the debts owed by Ukraine.

In January 2009, this disagreement resulted in supply disruptions in many European nations, with eighteen European countries reporting major drops in or complete cut-offs of their gas supplies transported through Ukraine from Russia. Gazprom accused Ukraine of taking gas intended for European customers. Naftogaz acknowledged taking gas from the transit volumes, but said it was “technical” gas needed to operate the pipeline network. In September 2009 officials from both countries stated they felt the situation was under control and that there would be no more conflicts over the topic, at least until the Ukrainian 2010 presidential elections. However, in October 2009, another disagreement arose about the amount of gas Ukraine would import from Russia in 2010. Ukraine intended to import less gas in 2010 as a result of reduced industry needs because of its economic recession; however, Gazprom insisted that Ukraine fulfill its contractual obligations and purchase the previously agreed upon quantities of gas.

On 8 June 2010, a Stockholm court of arbitration ruled Naftohaz of Ukraine must return 12.1 billion cubic metres (430 billion cubic feet) of gas to RosUkrEnergo, a Swiss-based company in which Gazprom controls a 50% stake. Several high-ranking Ukrainian officials stated the return "would not be quick".

Russia plans to completely abandon gas supplies to Europe through Ukraine after 2018. Gazprom has already substantially reduced the volumes of gas it transits across Ukraine, and expressed its intention of reducing the level further by means of transit diversification pipelines (Nord Stream, Turkish Stream, etc.).

In 2021 natural gas prices in the European Union have risen as high as 800% from the beginning of the year. The dispute is over the Nord Stream 2 Gas pipeline and other disputes such as Yamal-Europe pipeline that usually sends Russian gas to Western Europe was flowing in reverse.

On 1 January 2025, Ukraine terminated all Russian gas transit through its territory, after the contract between Gazprom and Naftohaz signed in 2019 expired.

== Historical background ==
After the dissolution of the Soviet Union, oil import prices to Ukraine reached world market levels in 1993. However, gas import prices and transit fees remained below European levels for Russian exports to Europe through pipelines in Ukraine; these were set in bilateral negotiations. At the same time Ukraine remained the main transit corridor for Russia's gas export. In 2004–2005, 80% of Russian gas exports to the European Union were made through Ukrainian territory. Two-thirds of Gazprom's revenue comes from the sale of gas that crosses Ukraine.

Ukraine's annual gas consumption in 2004–2005 was around 80 billion cubic metres (2.8 trillion cubic feet). Around 20 billion cubic metres (710 billion cubic feet) were produced domestically, 36 billion cubic metres (1.3 trillion cubic feet) were bought from Turkmenistan, and 17 billion cubic metres (600 billion cubic feet) were received from Russia in exchange for transport of Russian natural gas. The remaining 8 billion cubic metres (280 billion cubic feet) were purchased from Russia.

The gas trading system differed substantially from the gas sale to the European Union. It caused problems in the form of large-scale deliveries of relatively cheap Russian gas causing an increase of energy-intensive industries. This supported Ukraine's status as one of the world's least energy-efficient countries and largest gas importers. There was an accumulation of Ukrainian debts and non-payment of the debts, unsanctioned diversion of gas and alleged theft from the transit system, and Russian pressure on Ukraine to hand over infrastructure in return for relief of debts accumulated over natural gas transactions.

Gas trading was conducted under a framework of bilateral intergovernmental agreements which provided for sales, transit volumes, gas prices, gas storage, and other issues such as the establishment of production joint ventures. Commercial agreements were negotiated between the relevant companies within the guidelines and dictates of that framework and supplemented by annual agreements specifying exact prices and volumes for the following year. Gas sales prices and transit tariffs were determined in relationship to each other.

Commercial agreements and trade relations have been non-transparent. Trade has been conducted via intermediaries such as Itera, EuralTransGaz, and RosUkrEnergo. RosUkrEnergo's involvement in the Russian-Ukrainian gas trade has been controversial. There are allegations that the company is controlled by Semion Mogilevich and its beneficiaries include strategically placed officials in the Russian and Ukrainian gas industries and governmental structures related to the energy sector.

Russian prime minister Vladimir Putin has made accusations that RosUkrEnergo is owned by a business ally of Ukraine's ex-president, Viktor Yushchenko. The Ukrainian investigation into RosUkrEnergo, during Yulia Tymoshenko's first term as prime minister, was closed after she was fired by Yushchenko in September 2005.

According to a contract between Gazprom and Naftogaz signed on 21 June 2002, payment for the transfer of Russian natural gas through the Ukrainian pipeline system had been made in exchange for no more than 15% of the gas pumped through Ukrainian territory to be taken in lieu of cash. This contract was supposed to be valid until the end of 2013. On 9 August 2004, the two companies signed an addendum to the contract, according to which the amount of gas given as a payment was calculated based on a tariff of US$1.09 for the transportation of 1,000 cubic meters of natural gas over a distance of 100 kilometres (62 mi); the addendum further stated the price of the natural gas supplied to Ukraine was to be $50 per 1,000 cubic meters (approximately $1.40 per million Btu).

This price was constant notwithstanding the gas prices in the European markets. According to the addendum the price was not subject to change until the end of 2009. Gazprom argued that this addendum was only applicable provided that the two countries sign an annual intergovernmental protocol that has higher legal status for specifying the terms of gas transit. According to Gazprom, the addendum becomes void as the annual protocol had not been signed for 2006 under the required terms. Russia claimed that Gazprom's subsidies to the Ukrainian economy amounted to billions of dollars.

According to the agreement of 2006, RosUkrEnergo was to receive no more than 20 percent of the total delivered gas, which in 2007 was 15 billion cubic metres (530 billion cubic feet) of 73 billion cubic metres (2.6 trillion cubic feet).

== Disputes of the 1990s ==
Initial disputes concerning gas debts and non-payment appeared immediately after the collapse of the Soviet Union. As a result of disputes over non-payments by Ukraine, Russia suspended natural gas exports several times between 1992 and 1994. This led to the illicit diversion of Russian natural gas exports from transit pipelines by Ukrainian companies and institutions in September 1993 and November 1994. The diversion of gas was acknowledged by Ukraine, while accusations of other diversions were disputed.

In September 1993, at a summit conference in Massandra, Crimea, Russian president Boris Yeltsin offered to Ukrainian president Leonid Kravchuk to forgive Ukrainian debts in return for control of the Black Sea Fleet and Ukraine's nuclear arsenal. After a strong negative reaction from politicians in Kyiv, the idea was abandoned. An intergovernmental agreement was drafted on gas issues, including a clause stating Ukraine would permit Gazprom to participate in the privatization of Ukrainian enterprises in gas and other sectors.

In March 1994, a Ukrainian deputy prime minister agreed with Russia that Gazprom could acquire a 51% stake in the pipeline system. In early 1995, Russia and Ukraine agreed to create a joint company, Gaztransit, to operate Ukraine's natural gas transit infrastructure in exchange for the cancellation of a substantial portion of Ukraine's debts to Russia. These agreements were never implemented, and in November 1995, the Verkhovna Rada, Ukraine's parliament, adopted a law prohibiting the privatization of oil and gas assets.

In 1998, Gazprom and Naftohaz made a contract under which Gazprom would pay for the transit of volumes of gas, which established a link between gas prices and transit tariffs, but this contract did not resolve the problem of already incurred gas debts. In 1998, Gazprom alleged that Ukraine had illegally diverted gas meant for export to other European countries and suspended exports of oil and electricity to Ukraine in 1999. Gazprom also claimed that Ukraine's gas debt had reached $2.8 billion.

In 2001, Deputy Prime Minister Oleh Dubyna acknowledged that in 2000 alone 8–7 billion cubic metres (280–250 billion cubic feet) of Russian natural gas had been diverted from export pipelines. The debt issue was settled on 4 October 2001, by the signing of an intergovernmental agreement on Additional Measures Regarding the Provision of Transit of Russian Natural Gas on the Territory of Ukraine (the 2001 Transit Agreement).

== Dispute of 2005–2006 ==
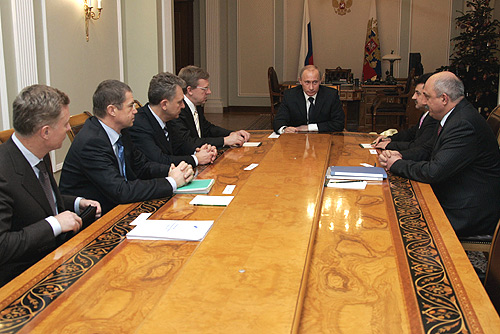
Then President of Russia Vladimir Putin at a meeting on 29 December 2005, with Alexei Kudrin (Russian Finance Minister), Viktor Khristenko (Russian Energy Minister), Alexander Medvedev (Deputy Chairman of the Gazprom board), Ivan Plachkov (Ukrainian Energy Minister) and Oleksiy Ivchenko (CEO of Naftohaz), in which the dispute was discussed.

Beginning in 2004, amidst rising international gas prices, Gazprom insisted on gradually adapting gas prices charged. Until 2005 Ukraine was charged $50 per 1,000 c. New CEO of Naftohaz Oleksiy Ivchenko at March 2005 proposed transit price rise to $1.75—2 per 1000 cubic meters. In negotiations over gas prices for 2006 Gazprom insisted on a new price of $160 per 1,000 cubic meters. The Government of Ukraine agreed, with the stipulation that price increases were to be gradual, in return for increased gas transit fees and changing the method of payment for transit from payment in kind to cash.

In May 2005, it was revealed that 7.8 billion cubic metres (280 billion cubic feet) of gas which Gazprom had deposited in Ukrainian storage reservoirs during the previous winter had not been made available to the company. It remained unclear if the gas was missing, had disappeared due to technical problems, or had been stolen.

This issue was resolved in July 2005 by agreement between Gazprom, Naftohaz and RosUkrEnergo, according to which Naftohaz received 2.55 billion cubic metres (90 billion cubic feet) of gas as partial settlement of the Russian gas transit over 2005 services and 5.25 billion cubic metres (185 billion cubic feet) was sold by Gazprom to RosUkrEnergo who has to receive it from Naftohaz. However, the negotiations between Gazprom and Naftohaz over gas prices and a new gas supply agreement failed. On 1 January 2006, Gazprom started reducing the pressure in the pipelines from Russia to Ukraine.

Although Russia cut off supplies only to Ukraine, a number of European countries saw a drop in their supplies as well. The European Commissioner for Energy Andris Piebalgs and several affected member states warned that blocking of gas deliveries was unacceptable. Pascal Lamy, director general of the World Trade Organization, expressed the opinion that all Post-Soviet states should pay market prices for their energy needs in order to improve the efficiency of their economies.

The supply was restored on 4 January 2006, after the preliminary agreement between Ukraine and Gazprom was settled. A five-year contract was signed, although with prices set for only six months. According to the contract, the gas was sold not directly to Naftohaz, but to the intermediary Russian-Swiss company RosUkrEnergo. The price of natural gas sold by Gazprom to RosUkrEnergo rose to $230 per 1,000 cubic metres, which, after mixing it in a proportion of one-third Russian gas to two-thirds cheaper supplies from Central Asia, was resold to Ukraine at a price of $95 per 1,000 cubic metres.

The parties agreed to raise the tariff for transit from US$1.09 to US$1.60 per 1,000 cubic meters per 100 km; this applied not only to the transit of Russian gas to Europe, but also Turkmen gas through Russia to Ukraine. On 11 January 2006, Presidents Vladimir Putin and Viktor Yushchenko confirmed that the conflict had been concluded.

== Dispute of 2007–2008 ==
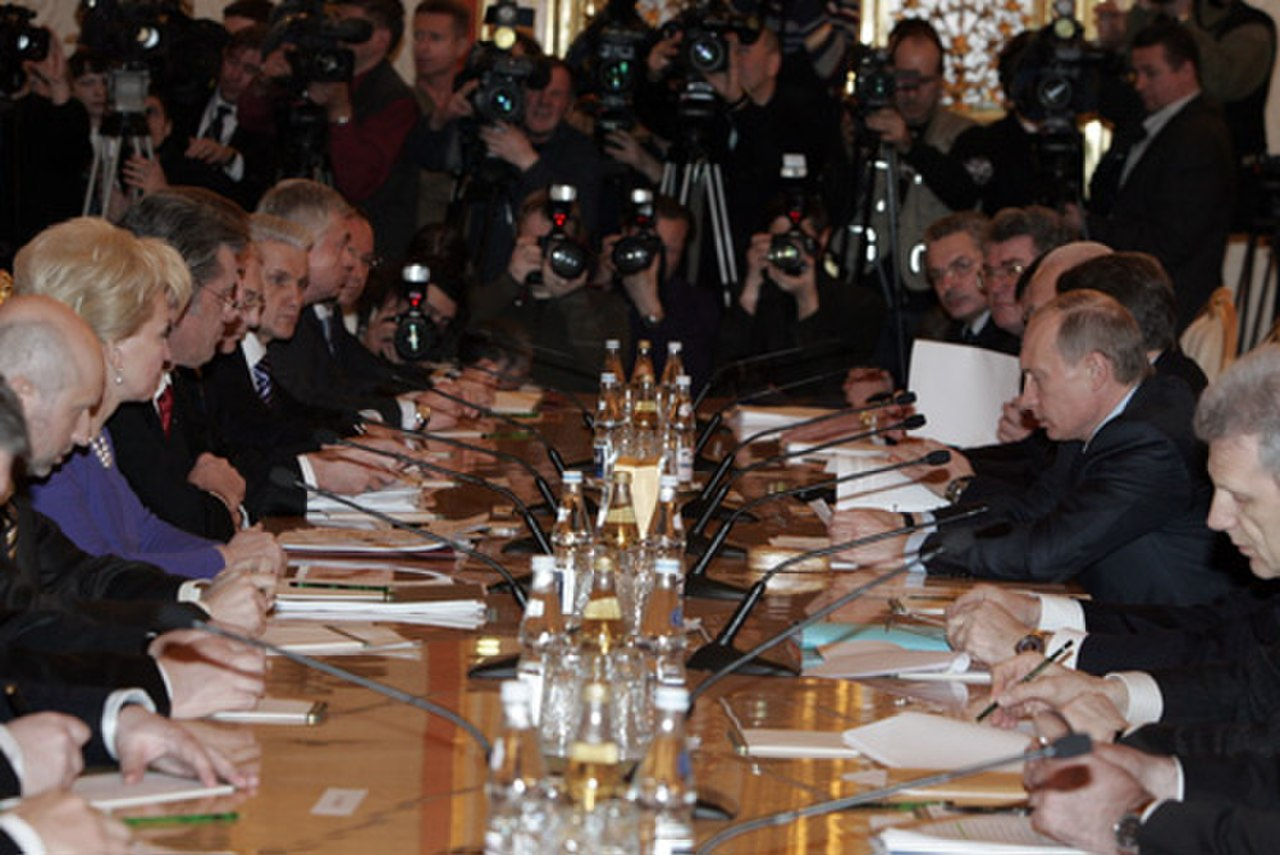
Then President of Russia Vladimir Putin and President of Ukraine Viktor Yushchenko at a meeting of the Russian–Ukrainian Intergovernmental Commission at the Kremlin on 12 February 2008, at which the gas dispute was discussed.

On 2 October 2007, Gazprom threatened to cut off gas supplies to Ukraine because of unpaid debt of $1.3 billion. This dispute appeared to be settled on 8 October 2007. On 5 January 2008, Gazprom warned Ukraine that it would reduce its gas supplies on 11 January if $1.5 billion in gas debts were not paid. On 12 February 2008, presidents Putin and Yushchenko announced an agreement on the gas issue. Ukraine would begin paying off its debts for natural gas consumed in November–December 2007 and the price of $179.5 would be preserved in 2008. The presidents also decided to replace RosUkrEnergo and UkrGazEnergo with two new intermediaries, creating them as joint ventures of Gazprom and Naftogaz.

At the end of February 2008, Gazprom threatened to reduce the supply of natural gas to Ukraine beginning on 3 March 2008, unless the pre-payment for 2008 was paid. The Ukrainian government said it paid for the natural gas which was consumed in 2007, but refused to pay the bill for 2008. A Gazprom spokesman claimed that the bill for 1.9 billion cubic metres (67 billion cubic feet) of gas deliveries to Ukraine valued around $600 million remained unpaid. Ukraine disagreed as that debt accumulated in recent months when Russia used its own gas to make up for a shortfall in less expensive Central Asian gas.

On 3 March, Gazprom cut its shipments to Ukraine by 25% and an additional 25% the next day, claiming that the $1.5 billion debt still was not paid, although Ukrainian officials stated it had indeed been paid. Gas supplies were restored on 5 March after Gazprom CEO Alexei Miller and Naftohaz CEO Oleh Dubyna agreed during negotiations by phone on a settlement. On 6 March, the Ukrainian cabinet refused to execute the gas agreements made by presidents Yushchenko and Putin. The Ukrainian cabinet did not want to pay in advance for 2008, and it opposed the creation of a Naftohaz–Gazprom venture that would sell gas in Ukraine. Prime Minister Yulia Tymoshenko stated that Ukraine did not need any additional joint ventures, and as of 1 March 2008, UkrGazEnergo is no longer operating in Ukraine's domestic gas market.

== Dispute of 2008–2009 ==
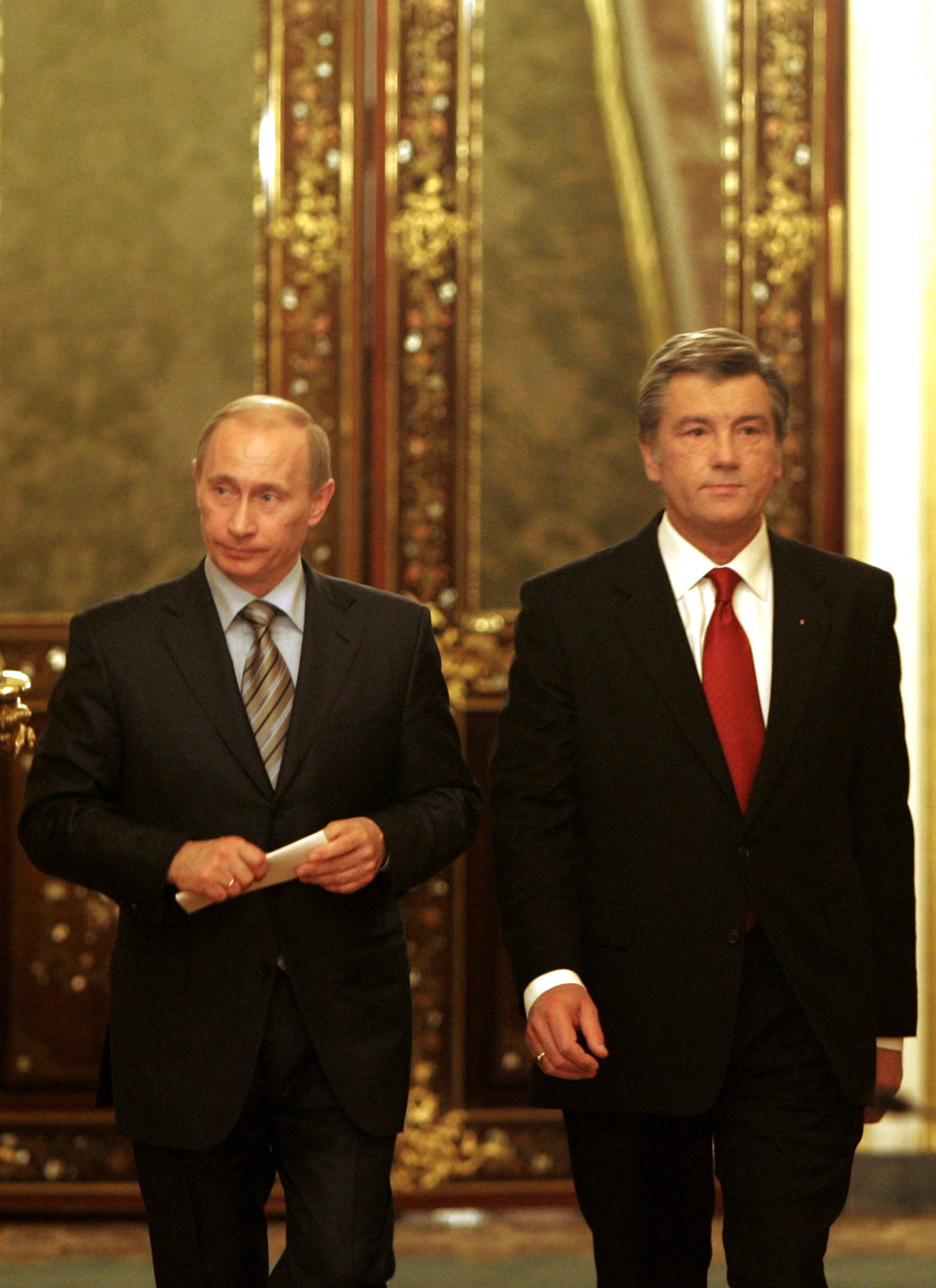
Vladimir Putin and Viktor Yushchenko (12 February 2008)

The gas crisis of 2009 began with a failure to reach an agreement on gas prices and supplies for 2009. Ukraine owed a debt of $2.4 billion to Gazprom for gas already consumed, and Gazprom requested payment before the commencement of a new supply contract. In December 2008, despite Ukraine's repayment of more than $1 billion of its debt, Gazprom maintained its position, intending to cut the supply of natural gas to Ukraine on 1 January 2009, if Ukraine did not fully repay the remainder of $1.67 billion debt in natural gas supplies and an additional $450 million in fines levied by Gazprom.

On 30 December, Naftohaz paid $1.522 billion, of the outstanding debt, but the two parties were not able to agree on the price for 2009. Ukraine proposed a price of $201, and later increased their proposed price to $235, while Gazprom demanded $250 per 1,000 cubic meters. Negotiations between Gazprom and Naftohaz were interrupted on 31 December.

On 1 January 2009, exports to Ukraine of 90 million cubic meters of natural gas per day were halted completely at 10:00 MSK. Exports intended for transhipment to the EU continued at a volume of 300 million cubic meters per day. President Yushchenko requested that the European Union become involved in the settlement of this dispute in a letter to the president of the European Commission Jose Manuel Barroso. A Ukrainian delegation including Fuel and Energy Minister Yuriy Prodan, Deputy Foreign Minister Konstantin Yeliseyev, the president's Representative for Energy Issues Bohdan Sokolovsky, and Deputy Head of Naftohaz Vadym Chuprun visited the Czech Republic as the first stop on a tour of a number EU member states to hold consultations on the gas crisis.

On 2 January 2009, Hungary, Romania, and Poland reported that pressure in their pipelines had dropped. Bulgaria also reported that their natural gas supply was dropping, affecting the shipment of natural gas to Turkey, Greece, and Macedonia. Furthermore, the United Kingdom Government announced that it was preparing to enter its gas reserves after gas pressure had dropped from the continent. On 4 January 2009, both RosUkrEnergo and Gazprom filed lawsuits against Ukraine and Naftohaz respectively with the Stockholm Tribunal of the Arbitration Institute. Ukraine also filed lawsuits with the tribunal. According to Naftohaz, RosUkrEnergo owes the company $40 million for services in transportation of natural gas. On 5 January 2009, Kyiv's economic court banned Naftohaz from transshipping Russian natural gas in 2009 at the price of $1.60 per 1,600 cubic meters per 100 kilometers. The court declared contracts made by Naftohaz for the transit of natural gas through Ukraine void because the contracts were signed by Naftohaz without authorization from the Cabinet of Ministers of Ukraine. On 30 March 2010, the Stockholm tribunal ordered Naftohaz to pay RosUkrEnergo around $200 million as a penalty for various breaches of supply, transit, and storage contracts. On 8 June 2010, the tribunal ordered Naftohaz to return 11 billion cubic metres (390 billion cubic feet) of natural gas to RosUkrEnergo. The tribunal further ordered that RosUkrEnergo would receive from Naftohaz a further 1.1 billion cubic metres (39 billion cubic feet) of natural gas in lieu of RosUkrEnergo's damages for breach of contract.

On 5 January 2009 Russian prime minister Vladimir Putin instructed Gazprom CEO Alexei Miller to reduce natural gas exports to Europe via transshipment through Ukraine by quantities equivalent to the amounts of gas which Ukraine had allegedly diverted from the pipelines since deliveries ended on 1 January 2009. On 7 January, all Russian natural gas exports via Ukraine were halted amid accusations between the two parties. Several countries reported a major fall in supplies of Russian gas starting on 7 January; Bulgaria, Moldova, and Slovakia were among the most affected by these supply drops.

Talks between Naftohaz and Gazprom resumed overnight on 8 January 2009. Ukraine agreed to guarantee the unfettered transport of natural gas on the condition that Gazprom would guarantee and supply technical gas for Ukraine's gas transit system to function; this was denied by Russia. The supplies to Europe were not restored although the European Union, Ukraine, and Russia agreed to the deployment of an international monitoring group to the gas metering stations between Russia and Ukraine. Naftohaz blocked the transit of gas, blaming a lack of pressure in the pipeline system and saying the design of the Soviet-built pipeline meant it could not ship gas entering through the Sudzha metering station governing gas leaving through the Orlivka metering station without cutting off the Donetsk region, Luhansk region, and portions of the Dnipropetrovsk region of Ukraine. Naftohaz suggested a technically more feasible alternative through the Valuyki and Pisarevka metering stations but was refused.

The signing of the deal reached at the Moscow summit on 19 January 2009, by Oleh Dubyna and Alexei Miller (with Yulia Tymoshenko and Vladimir Putin are standing in the background)

On 17 January 2009, Russia held an international gas conference in Moscow. The EU was represented by the Presidency, the Czech minister of industry and trade Martin Říman, and the EU energy commissioner Andris Piebalgs, so that the European Union could speak with one voice. Ukraine was represented by the prime minister Yulia Tymoshenko. The conference did not achieve any solution to the crisis, and the negotiations continued bilaterally between Prime Ministers Putin and Tymoshenko. Early on 18 January 2009, after five hours of talks, Putin and Tymoshenko reached a deal to restore gas supplies to Europe and Ukraine. Both parties agreed that Ukraine would start paying European prices for its natural gas, less a 20% discount for 2009, and that Ukraine would pay the full European market price starting in 2010. In return for the discounts for 2009, Ukraine agreed to keep its transit fee for Russian gas unchanged in 2009. The two sides also agreed not to use intermediaries. On 19 January 2009, Gazprom CEO Alexei Miller and the head of Naftohaz Oleh Dubyna signed an agreement on natural gas supply to Ukraine for the period of 2009–2019. Gas supplies restarted on 20 January 2009, and were fully restored on 21 January.

According to the EU Commission and Presidency, the Russia–Ukraine gas disputes caused irreparable and irreversible damage to customers' confidence in Russia and Ukraine, causing Russia and Ukraine to no longer be regarded as reliable partners. According to reports, due to the gas crisis Gazprom lost more than $1.1 billion in revenue for the unsupplied gas. Ukraine also incurred losses as a result of the temporary closure of its steel and chemical industries due to the lack of gas. Ukraine also lost $100 million of potential revenue in transit fees from natural gas.

There were also accusations of illegal diversion of natural gas by Ukraine; however, these accusations were not confirmed. The issue of technical gas used to fuel compressor stations and to maintain gas pressure in the pipeline network remained unclear. Some sources asserted that the responsibility for providing the technical gas falls to Ukraine, while others say that this is the responsibility of Gazprom.

There were several theories as to alleged political motives behind the gas disputes, including Russia exerting pressure on Ukrainian politicians or attempting to subvert EU and NATO expansions to include Ukraine. Others suggested that Ukraine's actions were being orchestrated by the United States. Both sides tried to win sympathy for their arguments fighting a PR war.

In August 2009, it was agreed that loans worth $1.7 billion would be given to Ukraine to help it provide stable supplies of Russian gas to Europe by the International Monetary Fund, the World Bank, and the European Bank for Reconstruction and Development, in return for reforms in Ukraine's gas sector.

On 28 December 2009, the Slovak government announced that Russia warned it would stop oil supplies to Slovakia, Hungary, and the Czech Republic over a transit price dispute with Ukraine. However, the next day, Ukraine's Naftohaz issued a statement confirming that Russia agreed to a 30% increase in the transit fees through Ukraine. The alleged rise in the tariff would be from $7.8 to $9.50 (or €6.6) per tonne of oil going through Ukraine in 2010. Additionally, unlike previous payments, new payments would be made in Euros as this was one of Ukraine's demands. Russia and Ukraine also agreed on the volume of oil to be transported through Ukraine. The overall amount of oil to be transported to Slovakia, Czech Republic, and Hungary through Ukraine in 2010 will be 15 million tonnes—a decrease from 17.1 million tonnes in 2008.

== 2010 natural gas agreement ==
=== Prologue ===
After meeting her Russian counterpart Putin, Ukrainian prime minister Tymoshenko declared on 3 September 2009, "Both sides, Russia and Ukraine, have agreed that at Christmas, there won't be [any halt in gas supplies], as usually happens when there are crises in the gas sector. Everything will be quite calm on the basis of the current agreements". Tymoshenko also said that the Ukrainian and Russian premiers had agreed that sanctions would not be imposed on Ukraine for the country buying less gas than expected and that the price of Russian gas transit across Ukraine may grow 65% till 70% in 2010. A week before Gazprom had said it expected gas transit fees via Ukraine to rise by up to 59% in 2010.

On 8 October 2009 Tymoshenko announced that Ukrainian 2010 natural gas imports will be significantly less than in previous years "because we have less need for natural gas". Because of its economic recession the industries require far less gas. In response to Tymoshenko Gazprom Chief Executive Alexey Miller stated that Ukraine should stick to the January (2009) contract for 2010.

On 16 November 2009 Commissioner for Energy at the European Commission Andris Piebalgs stated that Russia and the European Union do not expect another gas conflict with Ukraine. According to him there were no gas price negotiations or questions other than that of gas payments.

On 20 November 2009, the gas deal of 18 January 2009, was altered after a meeting between Tymoshenko and Putin in Yalta; meaning Ukraine would not be fined for buying less gas then the old contract stipulated, this was done in view of the 2008–2009 Ukrainian financial crisis. On 24 November 2009 Gazprom and Naftohaz signed these supplements to the contract of 19 January 2009 on the purchase and sale of natural gas; according to the supplements, the annual contracted amount of gas to be supplied to Ukraine in 2010 has been set at 33.75 billion cubic metres (1.192 trillion cubic feet), instead of the 52 billion cubic metres (1.8 trillion cubic feet) contracted earlier. The documents signed by the sides also stipulated that there will be no fines related to the amount of gas consumed by Naftohaz in 2009. Over the first ten months of 2009 Naftohaz has purchased 18.85 billion cubic metres (666 billion cubic feet) of gas with the contracted volume being 31.7 billion cubic metres (1.12 trillion cubic feet).

On 15 December 2009, Russian Energy Minister Sergei Shmatko stated he expects no problems with Ukraine over gas supplies at New Year.

=== Agreement ===
Ukrainian prime minister Mykola Azarov and Energy Minister Yuriy Boyko were in Moscow late March 2010 to negotiate lower gas prices; neither clearly explained what Ukraine was prepared to offer in return. Following these talks Russian prime minister Vladimir Putin stated that Russia was prepared to discuss the revision of the price for natural gas it sells to Ukraine.

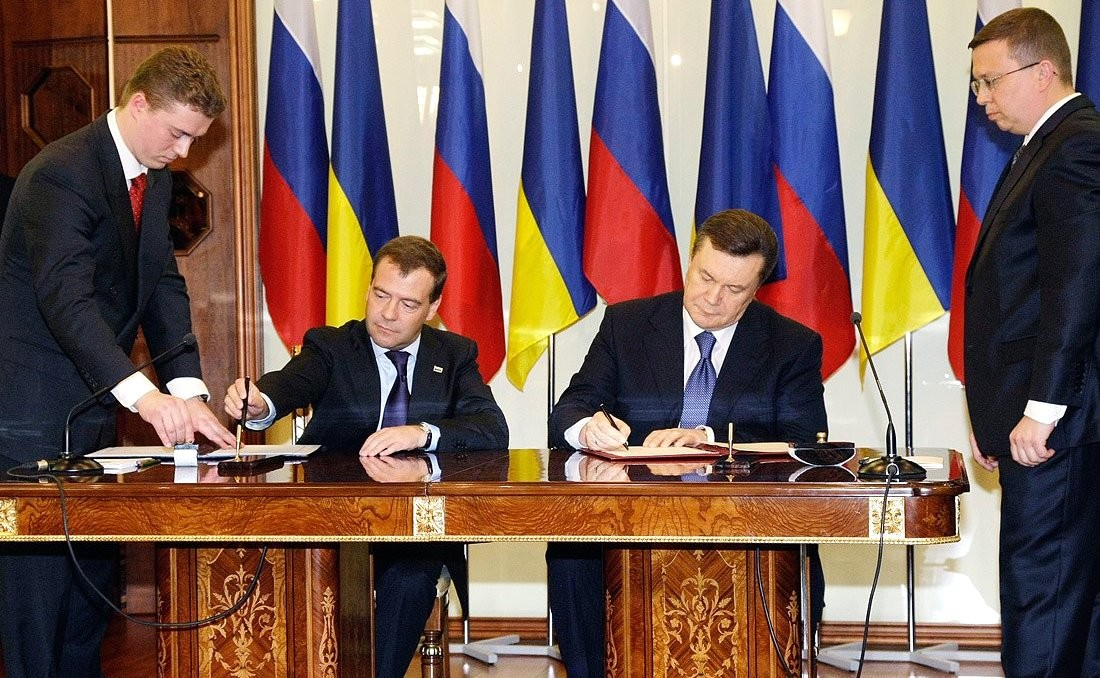
Signing of the deal reached at the Kharkiv summit on 21 April 2010 by Dimitry Medvedev and Viktor Yanukovych

On 21 April 2010, Russian president Dmitry Medvedev and Ukrainian president Viktor Yanukovych signed an agreement in which Russia agreed to a 30 percent drop in the price of natural gas sold to Ukraine. Russia agreed to this in exchange for permission to extend Russia's lease of a major naval base in the Ukrainian Black Sea port of Sevastopol for an additional 25 years with an additional five-year renewal option (to 2042–47). As of June 2010 Ukraine pays Gazprom around $234/mcm (thousand cubic meter).

This agreement was subject to approval by both the Russian and Ukrainian parliaments. They did ratify the agreement on 27 April 2010. The Ukrainian parliament ratified it after several eggs were thrown towards the speaker, Volodymyr Lytvyn, by deputies and other incidents. Opposition members in Ukraine and Russia expressed doubts the agreement would be fulfilled by the Ukrainian side.

Yanukovych has defended the agreement as a tool to help stabilise the state budget. Opposition members in Ukraine described the agreement as a sell out of national interests.

== Dispute of 2013–2014 ==
=== Annexation of Crimea ===
In February 2014, Ukraine's state-owned oil and gas company Naftogaz sued Chornomornaftogaz for delayed debt payments of ₴11.614 billion (almost €1 billion) in the Economic Court of the Autonomous Republic of Crimea.

In March 2014, Republic of Crimea authorities announced that they would nationalize the company. Republic of Crimea deputy prime minister Rustam Temirgaliev said that Russia's Gazprom would be its new owner. A group of Gazprom representatives, including its head of business development, has been working at the Chornomornaftogaz head office since mid-March 2014. On 1 April, Russia's energy minister Alexander Novak said that Gazprom would finance an undersea gas pipeline to Crimea.

On 11 April 2014 the U.S. Treasury's Office of Foreign Assets Control (OFAC) announced that it had added Chornomornaftagaz to the Specially Designated Nationals and Blocked Persons List as part of the third round of U.S. sanctions. Reuters quoted an anonymous U.S. official who explained that the United States wanted to make it impossible for Gazprom to "have dealings with Chornomorneftegaz", and if that were to happen, Gazprom itself could face sanctions.

The European Union followed suit on 13 May 2014, the first time its sanctions list has included a company (in addition to Chornomorneftegaz, a Crimean oil supplier called Feodosia was also included).

In 2014, Russia had seized Crimea and taken assets belonging to Ukraine, with no compensation paid. In 2023, A court in The Hague ordered Russia to pay US$5 billion in compensation to Naftogaz.

=== June 2014 gas supplies to Ukraine cut off ===
In an attempt at energy independence, Naftogaz signed a pipeline access deal with Slovakia's Eustream on 28 April 2014. Eustream and its Ukrainian counterpart Ukrtransgaz, owned by Naftogaz, agreed to allow Ukraine to use a never used (but aging, at 20 years old) pipeline on Slovakia's eastern border with Uzhhorod in western Ukraine. The deal would provide Ukraine with 3 billion cubic meters of natural gas beginning in autumn of 2014 with the aim of increasing that amount to 10 billion cubic meters in 2015.

On 1 April 2014 Gazprom cancelled Ukraine's natural gas discount as agreed in the 17 December 2013 Ukrainian–Russian action plan because its debt to the company had risen to $1.7 billion since 2013. Later that month the price "automatically" jumped to $485 per 1,000 cubic meters because the Russian government annulled an export-duty exemption for Gazprom in place since the 2010 Kharkiv Pact (this agreement was denounced by Russia on 31 March 2014). On 30 May 2014 Ukraine paid $786 million to Gazprom. On 16 June 2014 Gazprom stated that Ukraine's debt to the company was $4.5 billion.

After intermediary (that had started in May 2014) trilateral talks between EU Energy Commissioner Günther Oettinger, Ukraine and Russia failed on 15 June 2014 the latter halted (after a deadline of 10 a.m. Moscow time passed without it receiving payment) its natural gas supplies to Ukraine the next day. Unilaterally Gazprom decided that Ukraine had to pay upfront for its natural gas. The company assured that its supplies to other European countries would continue. Ukraine vowed to "provide reliable supply of gas to consumers in Ukraine and we will provide reliable transit to the European Union". At the time about 15 percent of European Union's demand depended on Russian natural gas piped through Ukraine.

After trilateral months of talks between the European Union, Ukraine and Russia a deal was reached on 30 October 2014 in which Ukraine agreed to pay (in advance) $378 per 1,000 cubic metres to the end of 2014, and $365 in the first quarter (ending on 31 March) of 2015. Of its debts to Gazprom Ukraine agreed to pay of $1.45bn immediately, and $1.65bn by the end of 2014. It was agreed that the European Union will be acting as guarantor for Ukraine's gas purchases from Russia and would help to meet outstanding debts (using funds from existing accords with the European Union and IMF). The total package was worth $4.6bn. According to European Union officials the deal secured that there would be no natural gas supply disruptions in other European countries.

== November 2015 gas supplies stop ==
On 25 November 2015 Gazprom halted its exports of Russian natural gas to Ukraine. According to the Ukrainian government they had stopped buying from Gazprom because Ukraine could buy natural gas cheaper from other suppliers. According to Gazprom it had halted deliveries because Ukraine had not paid them for the next delivery. Since then, Ukraine has been able to fulfil its gas supply needs solely from European Union states. In 2018 the Arbitration Institute of the Stockholm Chamber of Commerce ordered that Ukraine's Naftogaz should import 5 billion cubic meters of gas annually from Russia, as required under its 2009 contract with Russia's Gazprom. However, take-or-pay claims by Gazprom for 2009–2014 untaken gas volumes were rejected. On 28 February 2018, the Arbitration Institute of the Stockholm Chamber of Commerce ordered that Gazprom pay Naftogaz for failing to ship certain amounts of gas through Ukraine gas transmission system. The net result of all claims was that Gazprom was ordered to pay Naftogaz $2.56 bln. Gazprom disputed this award and fought it off in several European courts where Naftogaz was trying to enforce the award. In the end, a settlement of principle was reached in Berlin on 20 December 2019 as part of wider trilateral talks between Gazprom, Ukraine and the European Commission on Russian gas transit through Ukraine. In September 2022, the two parties continued disagreeing about the arbitration process.

Transit of Russian gas through Ukraine continued, in January 2022 Ukraine charged Gazprom $2.66 to move 1,000 cubic meters per 100 kilometers.

== 2022 Ukraine war-related gas issues ==
Following the escalation of the Russo-Ukrainian War, Ukraine′s Crisis Committee approved by order of the Ministry of Energy of Ukraine decreed on 26 February 2022 that non-transit natural gas exports from Ukraine would be prohibited. By 4 March 2022, LLC Gas TSO of Ukraine had shut down 16 gas distribution stations (GDS) which, two days later increased to 39 stations. In Kyiv alone, six gas distribution stations that provided service to 96,000 civilians were disconnected and could not be repaired due to active shelling. Shelling in the Luhansk and Donetsk regions increased the number of offline GDS to 93 by 27 May 2022, and the Sokhranivka gas transfer point (near Novopskov in Luhansk) has been shut off since then, while the Sudzha point has transferred around 42 mcm/day.

Reacting to the rounds of 2022 E.U. sanctions on Russia, established shortly after the beginning of the invasion, in February and March 2022, President Vladimir Putin announced on 23 March 2022, that payments for Russian pipeline gas would be switched from "the currencies that had been compromised" (US dollar and euro) to payments in roubles vis-à-vis the previously formally designated "unfriendly countries", including all European Union states as well as Ukraine; on 28 March, he ordered the Central Bank of Russia, the government, and Gazprom to present proposals by 31 March for gas payments in rubles from "unfriendly countries".

Russian gas continues to transit Ukraine in 2023, going to Austria, 6.0bcm p.a., Slovakia, 6.5bcm, and Hungary, 1.0bcm (part of their national supply). All three countries pay Russia in rubles. Russian gas piped through Ukraine in 2023 was 14.4bcm, with only the Sudzha, Urengoy–Pomary–Uzhhorod pipeline operational. Ukraine is contracted to provide the service until December 2024. Gazprom is obliged to provide the gas and pay the transit fees to Ukraine.

As a result of the August 2024 Kursk Oblast incursion, fighting had started at a Sudzha gas measuring station on 7 August, which resulted in a 12% drop of natural gas flow through the Urengoy-Pomary-Uzhhorod pipeline.

=== 2025 termination of gas transit ===
On 1 January 2025, Ukraine terminated all Russian gas transit through its territory, after the contract between Gazprom and Naftohaz signed in 2019 expired. This comes a month after President Zelenskyy said that Ukraine would not allow Russia to use gas transits to earn "additional billions [...] on our blood, on the lives of our citizens". It is estimated that Russia will lose around €5bn a year as a result.

Austria, Slovakia, Moldova, and Transnistria had been relying on gas transiting through Ukraine. Austria's energy minister, Leonore Gewessler, commented that Austria was prepared and had found alternative suppliers. Moldova's government commented that it has enough gas until spring, after which it will buy electricity from Europe.

Slovak Prime Minister Robert Fico demanded that gas transfers through Ukraine continue. In early January he stated that Slovakia had enough gas for its own needs, but complained about the loss of some €500 million in transfer fees. He demanded to be compensated for the lost revenue; otherwise, his country would stop the delivery of electricity to Ukraine and reduce the support for Ukrainian refugees in Slovakia.

=== 2026 seizure of Russian state assets to compensate Naftogaz ===
In June 2025, the Federal Supreme Court of Switzerland ruled in favour of Naftogaz over its September 2022 claim against Gazprom, which refused to fully pay for gas transit services under the 2019 Russia-Ukraine Gas Transit Agreement (which expired on 1 January 2025) since the beginning of the 2022 Russian invasion of Ukraine. The Swiss Supreme Court ordered Gazprom to pay 1.4 billion USD to Naftogaz for breach of contract. In May 2026, the Astana International Financial Centre Court in Kazakhstan recognised the Swiss ruling, and granted permission to enforce this arbitration award in Kazakhstan.

In early June 2026, the National Enforcement Authority of Finland provisionally seized 3.7 million euros in Russian state funds intended to compensate Naftogaz for its losses suffered by Russia's seizure of Naftogaz' assets in occupied Crimea since 2014. Naftogaz and its subsidiaries had filed a compensation claim against the Russian Federation, and in 2023, the Permanent Court of Arbitration in The Hague ordered Russia to pay approximately 4.3 billion euros in compensation to Naftogaz. International law stipulates that countries which recognise the ruling (which Russia does not), can enforce it within their jurisdictions by seizing Russian state assets, and the Helsinki District Court in late May 2026 approved the enforcement of 2023 ruling. The 3.7 million euros come from a defunct cross-border cooperation programme from the European Union involving Finland and Russia, to which Russia had contributed about 3.7 million euros before it launched its full-scale invasion of Ukraine in February 2022. As the programme was subsequently terminated in response to the invasion, the funds remained under control of the Finnish Ministry of Economic Affairs and Employment until the temporary seizure in June 2026; if the ruling becomes permanent, the money would be given to Naftogaz in compensation.

== Public reaction in Ukraine ==
Political pressure from Russia to Ukraine led to the emergence of a public campaign to boycott Russian goods in Ukraine during the gas conflict of 2005–2006. Active actions in the campaign also continued in early 2009—during the gas war of 2008–2009.

== See also ==
- Black Sea Fleet dispute
- Druzhba pipeline
- Energy policy of Russia
- Energy superpower
- Energy Triangle
- Nabucco Pipeline
- Natural gas in Russia
- Natural gas in Ukraine
- Nord Stream 1
- Peak gas
- Russia in the European energy sector
- Russia–Belarus energy dispute
- Urengoy–Pomary–Uzhhorod pipeline
- Yamal–Europe pipeline
