= Federation of Employers of Ukraine =

The Federation of Employers of Ukraine (Ukrainian: Федерація роботодавців України, romanized: Federatsiia robotodavtsiv Ukrainy) is a major interest organisation for business and industry in Ukraine.

Intensive efforts towards unification of employers organizations materialized in the unification congress of the Federation of Employers of Ukraine on November 29, 2011 where Mr. Dmytro Firtash was elected President of the Federation. FEU has become the most powerful organization representing Ukraine's industry and business. The Federation has become an active and effective factor of influence upon social and economic processes in the country having signed Memorandums of Understanding with the State Tax Service of Ukraine, State Customs Service of Ukraine and Antimonopoly Committee of Ukraine and having established an ongoing dialog with the Cabinet of Ministers of Ukraine.

== History ==
At the founding congress of employers' organizations the Federation of Employers of Ukraine, composed of 14 regional employers' organizations, was founded on September 27, 2002. In January 2003 the Federation of Employers of Ukraine became a full member of the International Organization of Employers.

In 2004, for the first time, the Federation became a signatory of the General Agreement for 2004 to 2005 on behalf of national associations of employers. Thus, the European practice of relationship between state, employers and trade unions was initiated.

The FEU initiated development and adoption of the Decree of the President of Ukraine "On the development of social dialogue in Ukraine" under which the National Tripartite Social and Economic Council under the President of Ukraine was created in 2005. The Council aims at increasing of the role of employers' organizations and trade unions in economic and social policy shaping.

The first step towards the consolidation of Ukrainian Employers was made in 2009. The FEU initiated establishment of the Joint Representative Body of employers at the national level.

In Moscow, the FEU, as the most representative employers' organizations at the national level, signed an agreement on the establishment and membership in the International Coordinating Council of Employers Associations on April 15, 2010. The Council includes employers' organizations from 15 countries. The Chairman of the Board of Directors of Group DF Dmytro Firtash was elected the Head of the Joint Representative Body. The election officially launched the process of Ukrainian employers' unification. The Law of Ukraine "On Social Dialogue in Ukraine" was adopted due to the active participation of employers.

By the Decree of the President of Ukraine on implementation of the Law of Ukraine "On Social Dialogue in Ukraine" in 2011 the National Tripartite Social and Economic Council was created; Dmytro Firtash, the Head of the Joint Representative Body, became the Co-Chair of the council from employers' side. The FEU was recognized as a representative at the national level. This has given the Federation the legal right to participate in collective negotiations on the General Agreement, to delegate representatives to NTSEC, to funds of compulsory state social insurance and other constituents of the social dialogue and participation in international events.

November 29, 2011 – the historic event for business in Ukraine took place in Kyiv - the Unification Congress of the Federation of Employers of Ukraine was held. The majority of national employers' organizations in Ukraine became part of the FEU. Thus has been created the largest nationwide organization of employers in the history of Ukraine.

August 5, 2012 – the Law of Ukraine "On employers' organizations, their associations, the rights and guarantees of their activity" came into effect.
