= Igor Makarov (businessman) =

Turkmen philanthropist and entrepreneur

- Игорь Макаров
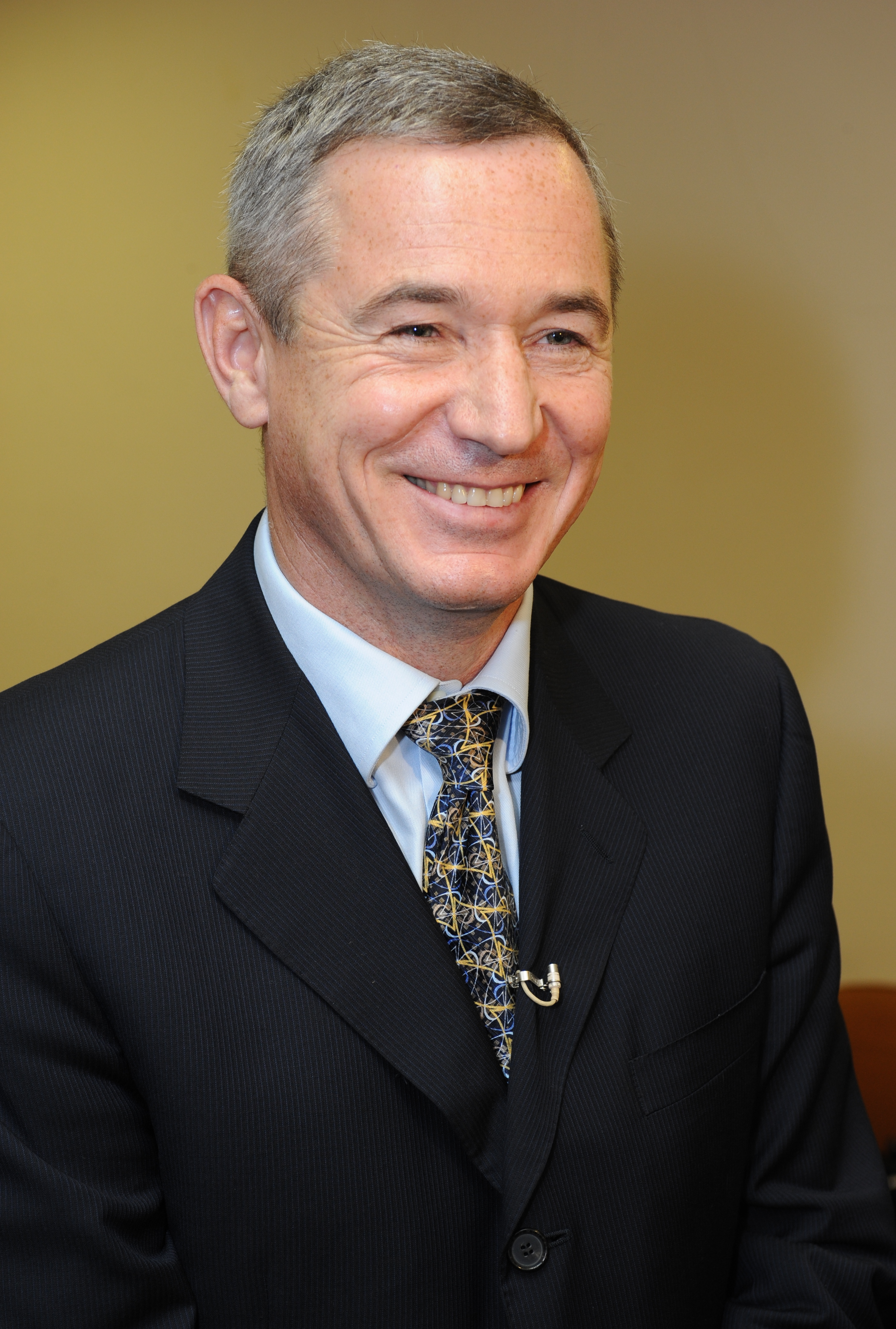
- Makarov in 2010
- Born: 5 April 1962 (age 64); Ashkhabad, Turkmen SSR, Soviet Union (now Turkmenistan)
- Occupation: Businessman
- Known for: President of ARETI International Group and former cyclist for the Soviet Union cycling team

Igor Viktorovich Makarov (Russian: Игорь Викторович Макаров; Turkmen: Igor Wiktorowiç Makarow; Romanian: Igor Viktorovici Makarov; Greek: Ιγκόρ Βικτόροβιτς Μακάροφ) born 5 April 1962) is a Turkmen-born Moldovan-Cypriot businessman who is the President of ARETI International Group (previously the founder of ITERA International Group).

A former professional cyclist and member of the USSR national cycling team, Makarov has, since his retirement from competition, been a key supporter and sponsor of international cycling and serves on the UCI Management Committee since 2011. In March 2023, Forbes estimated Makarov's net worth at $2.2 billion.

In the summer of 2023 Makarov renounced his Russian citizenship.

== Early life ==
Makarov was born as the only child of his parents in Ashkhabad, Turkmen SSR in 1962.

From 1979 to 1986, Makarov was a cyclist for the Soviet team, winning medals and awards.

He graduated from Turkmen State University in 1983, then served in the Soviet Army.

The name ARETI is derived from Makarov's previous company's name ITERA (spelled backwards). In the summer of 2017, Makarov's new yacht, Areti, was delivered by Lürssen.

== Career ==
ITERA Oil and Gas Company, founded in 1992 by Makarov with headquarters in Jacksonville, Florida and was the main subsidiary of the ITERA Group. Makarov purchased a mansion in the 1990s in Jacksonville, Florida, where ITERA was headquartered. Due to enormous reserves, Makarov's Itera was the fourth largest natural gas company in the world in 2000. (Note: In 1998, Itera became largest independent natural gas producer in Russia by 1998, and, in 2002, Gazprom began to reduce Itera’s market share by increasing transit tariffs.) In 2012, ITERA entered into a joint venture with Rosneft and a year later, Rosneft acquired Itera Oil and Gas Company for $2.9 billion. In 2015, ITERA International Group of Companies was renamed ARETI International Group as a result of a rebranding to signal a new direction subsequent to sale of Itera Oil and Gas Company in 2013.

On 26 September 2022, Makarov was sanctioned by the government of the United Kingdom due to the ongoing Russo-Ukrainian War. On 5 March 2024, United Kingdom removed sanctions on Makarov after a successful legal challenge. On 22 May 2025, Australia also removed sanctions on Makarov. On 12 September, 2025, New Zealand was the third Western country to remove Makarov from its sanctions list, concluding there was no legal basis to maintain restrictions. As of 1 January 2026, Canada was the only Western country to have imposed sanctions on Makarov. On 14 January 2026, Makarov, represented by King & Spalding, initiated arbitration proceedings against Canada under the auspices of the International Centre for Settlement of Investment Disputes in Washington, D.C., seeking damages of $350 million.

== Cycling ==
Makarov was a member of the USSR national cycling team, champion and prizewinner of the all-Union (USSR) and international cycling competitions. Makarov is also a Master of Sports of International Class.

He actively supports and sponsors the international cycling movement. From 2010 to 2016, he was President of the Russian Cycling Federation (RCF) and in 2016 was elected as Honorary President of the Russian Cycling Federation. In March 2011, Makarov became a member of the Management Committee of the International Cycling Union, UCI. The UCI team Katusha was created by Makarov in 2008 to develop cycling in emerging countries.

== Recognition ==
Makarov has been decorated with state awards from different countries for his significant contributions to developing economic relations and strengthening friendship and cooperation between the people. Among the awards are the following:

- Order of Friendship of Peoples (November 7, 2002, Belarus)
- Francysk Skaryna Medal (January 12, 2001, Belarus)
- Friendship Medal (Mongolia)
- Order "Gloria Muncii" (October 15, 2002, Moldova)
- Jubilee Medal “Independent, Permanently Neutral Turkmenistan” (December 2, 2015, Turkmenistan)
- Honored Worker of Physical Culture and Sports of the Republic of Adygea (October 14, 2014)
- Order of Holy Prince Daniel of Moscow (1st and 3rd degrees)
- Honorary Badge “Akinfiy Nikitich Demidov” (International Demidov Foundation)
- Aristidis Konstantinidis Prize (2025, Cyprus Cycling Federation)

== Philanthropy ==
Makarov has created the charitable Makarov Foundation to support children's welfare and people with autism and other developmental disabilities. Makarov, through his foundation, has given a grant to build the Mount Sinai Adult Autism Clinic, supported the Best Buddies International’s annual Hublot Best Buddies Challenge: Miami and the annual Tour de Broward 2020, which raised more than $700,000 for the Joe DiMaggio Children's Hospital.

In addition, Makarov is a patron of Louvre Abu Dhabi.
