= Semion Mogilevich =

Russian organized crime boss (born 1946)

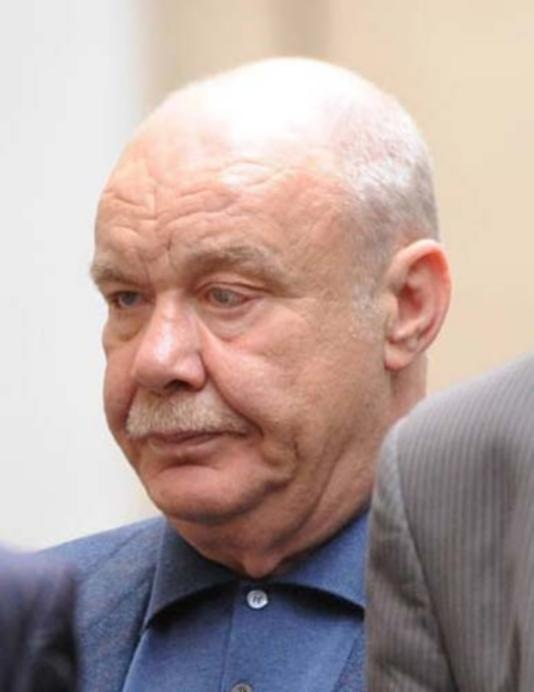
- An image of Semion Mogilevich released by the FBI and State Department on 6 April 2022

FBI Ten Most Wanted Fugitive
- Charges: Fraud by Wire; Racketeer Influenced and Corrupt Organizations Act Conspiracy; Mail Fraud; Money Laundering Conspiracy; Money Laundering; Arms trafficking; Drug trafficking; Human trafficking; Aiding and Abetting; Murder; Smuggling; Prostitution; Securities fraud; Filing False Registration With the SEC; False Filings With the SEC; Falsification of Books and Records
- Alias: Seva Moguilevich; Semon Yudkovich Palagnyuk; Semen Yukovich Telesh; Simeon Mogilevitch; Semjon Mogilevcs; Shimon Makelwitsh; Shimon Makhelwitsch; Sergei Yurevich Schnaider

Description
- Born: Semion Yudkovich Mogilevich; June 30, 1946 (age 80); Kyiv, Ukrainian SSR, Soviet Union
- Height: 168 cm (5 ft 6 in)
- Weight: 130 kg (290 lb)
- Occupation: Russian mafia boss, confidence trickster, businessman, racketeer, crime lord, gangster
- Spouse: Tatiana Markova (divorced) Galina Grigorieva (divorced) Katalin Papp (m. 1991)

Status
- Added: October 23, 2009
- Removed: December 17, 2015
- Number: 494
- Removed from Top Ten Fugitive List

Semion Yudkovich Mogilevich (Note: Russian: Семён Юдкович Могилевич, IPA: [sʲɪˈmʲɵn ˈjutkəvʲɪtɕ məɡʲɪˈlʲevʲɪtɕ]; Ukrainian: Семен Юдкович Могилевич, romanized: Semén Yúdkovych Mohylévych, IPA: [seˈmɛn ˈjudkowɪtʃ moɦɪˈlɛwɪtʃ]) (born June 30, 1946) is a Russian organized crime boss.

Described by agencies in the European Union and United States as the "boss of all bosses" of most Russian Mafia syndicates in the world, he is believed to direct a multi billion-dollar international criminal empire and is described by the Federal Bureau of Investigation (FBI) as "the most powerful and dangerous gangster in the world," with immense power and reach at a global scale, and connections to prominent government, military, and law enforcement officials, and powerful politicians around the world. He has been accused by the FBI of "weapons trafficking, contract murders, extortion, drug trafficking, and prostitution on an international scale."

Mogilevich's nicknames include "Don Semyon" and "The Brainy Don" (because of his business acumen). According to US diplomatic cables, he controls RosUkrEnergo, a company actively involved in Russia–Ukraine gas disputes, and is a partner of Ivan Gordiyenko.

== Early life ==
Mogilevich was born in 1946 to a Jewish family in Kyiv's Podil neighborhood. He graduated in economics from the University of Lviv.

His first significant fortune derived from scamming fellow Soviet Jews (mainly Ukrainian and Russian) eager to emigrate, including to Israel, the country where Mogilevich himself briefly lived in 1990. According to some reports, Mogilevich earned a considerable amount of money as an intermediary selling jewelry and artwork belonging to Jews who emigrated from Kyiv in the 1980s. Mogilevich made deals to purchase their assets, sell them for fair market value, and forward the proceeds. Instead he simply sold the assets and pocketed the proceeds. He served two terms in prison, of 3 and 4 years, for currency-dealing offenses.

In the 1980s, according to the FBI, Mogilevich was the key money-laundering contact for the Solntsevskaya Bratva.

== Hungary ==
In early 1991, Mogilevich moved to Hungary and married his Hungarian girlfriend Katalin Papp. He has at least three children: a daughter by ex-wife Tatiana Markova, a son with ex-wife Galina Grigorieva, and a son with Papp. Through his marriage to Papp, he obtained a Hungarian passport. Living in a fortified villa outside Budapest, he continued to invest in many enterprises; he bought a local armament factory, "Army Co-Op", which produced anti-aircraft guns.

In 1994, the Mogilevich group obtained control over Inkombank, one of the largest private banks in Russia, in a secret deal with bank chairman Vladimir Vinogradov, getting direct access to the world financial system. The bank collapsed in 1998 under suspicions of money laundering.

== Russia and Ukraine ==
Oleksandr Turchynov, who was designated the acting President of Ukraine in February 2014, appeared in court in 2010 for allegedly destroying files pertaining to Mogilevich. Shortly before his assassination, Russian FSB defector Alexander Litvinenko claimed Mogilevich had a "good relationship" with Vladimir Putin from the 1990s. (Note: In the Mykola Melnychenko recordings of 2000, Derkach, who is close to Mogilevich, states that Vladimir Putin is also very close to Mogilevich since Putin's early days in Leningrad.)

== Trump Tower ==
In the early 1990s, real estate developer and future U.S. president Donald Trump sold numerous properties to individuals with ties to the Russian mafia. Among them was also Semion Mogilevich who was among the early investors and bought an apartment in Trump Tower.

== Czech raid ==
In May 1995, a meeting in Prague between Mogilevich and Sergei Mikhailov, head of the Solntsevskaya Bratva, was raided by Czech police. The occasion was a birthday party for one of the deputy Solntsevo mafiosi. Two hundred partygoers (including dozens of prostitutes) in the restaurant "U Holubů", owned by Mogilevich, were detained and 30 expelled from the country. Police had been tipped off that the Solntsevo group intended to execute Mogilevich at the party over a disputed payment of $5 million. But Mogilevich never arrived and it is believed that a senior figure in the Czech police, working with the Russian mafia, had warned him. Soon after, the Czech Interior Ministry imposed a ten-year entry ban on him, while the Hungarian government declared him persona non grata and the British barred his entry into the UK, declaring him "one of the most dangerous men in the world."

== Toronto exchange ==
In 1997 and 1998, the presence of Mogilevich, Mikhailov and others associated with the Russian Mafia behind a public company trading on the Toronto Stock Exchange (TSX), YBM Magnex International Inc., was exposed by Canadian journalists. On May 13, 1998, dozens of agents for the FBI and several other U.S. government agencies raided YBM's headquarters in Newtown, Pennsylvania. Shares in the public company, which had been valued at $1 billion on the TSX, became worthless overnight.

== Toxic waste scheme with Italian American Mafia ==
In 1998, an FBI informant told the bureau that one of Mogilevich's chief lieutenants in Los Angeles met two Russians from New York City with Genovese crime family ties to broker a scheme to dump American toxic waste in Russia or Ukraine. Mogilevich's man from L.A. said the Red Mafia would dispose of the toxic waste in the Chernobyl region (Ukraine) "probably through payoffs to the decontamination there," says a classified FBI report.

== Money laundering and tax evasion ==
Until 1998, Inkombank and Bank Menatep participated in a US$10 billion money laundering scheme through the Bank of New York. Mogilevich was also suspected of participation in large-scale tax fraud, where highly taxed car fuel was sold as untaxed heating oil – one of the greatest scandals that broke around 1990–1991.

Estimates are that up to one-third of fuels sold went through this scheme, resulting in massive tax losses for various countries of Central Europe (Czech Republic, Hungary, Slovakia and Poland). In the Czech Republic the scandal is estimated to have cost the taxpayers around 100 billion CZK (≈US$5 billion) and involved, besides others, murders and the attempted assassination of a journalist writing about the problem.

In 2003, the United States Federal Bureau of Investigation placed Mogilevich on the "Wanted List" for participation in the scheme to defraud investors in Canadian company YBM Magnex International Inc. Frustrated by their previous unsuccessful efforts to charge him for arms trafficking and prostitution, they had now settled on the large-scale fraud charges as their best hope of running him to ground. He was considered to be the most powerful Russian mobster alive. In a 2006 interview, former Clinton administration anti-organized-crime official Jon Winer said: "I can tell you that Semion Mogilevich is as serious an organized criminal as I have ever encountered and I am confident that he is responsible for contract killings."

Mogilevich was arrested in Moscow on January 24, 2008, for suspected tax evasion. His bail was placed, and he was released on July 24, 2009. On his release, the Russian interior ministry stated that he was released because the charges against him "are not of a particularly grave nature".

Ivan Fursin has been closely linked to Mogilevich.

== U.S. apprehension efforts ==
A poster with photographs and identifying information of Semion Mogilevich, released by the FBI on 6 April 2022

On October 22, 2009, the FBI named Mogilevich as the 494th fugitive to be placed on the Ten Most Wanted list. The Bureau removed him from the list in December 2015, indicating that he no longer met list criteria, for reasons relating to living in a country with which the United States does not maintain an extradition treaty.

According to FBI reports, Mogilevich had alliances with the Camorra, in particular with Salvatore De Falco, a lower-echelon member of the Giuliano clan. Mogilevich and De Falco would have held meetings in Prague in 1993.

As to Mogilevich himself, government law enforcement agencies from throughout the world had by then been trying to prosecute him for over 10 years. But he had, in the words of one journalist, "a knack for never being in the wrong place at the wrong time".

Both Mogilevich and his associate Mikhailov ceased to travel to the West in the late 1990s.

On April 6, 2022, the Bureau refreshed its effort to apprehend Mogilevich, working in tandem with United States Department of State. The State Department's Transnational Organized Crime Rewards Program now offers a reward of up to $5 million for information "leading to the arrest and/or conviction" of Mogilevich.

William S. Sessions, Director of the FBI from 1987 to 1993 during the presidencies of Ronald Reagan and George H. W. Bush, was Mogilevich's attorney in the United States until Sessions' death on June 12, 2020.
