= Synkiv, Ternopil Oblast =

Rural locality in Ternopil Oblast, Ukraine

Synkiv Синьків
- Location in Ternopil Oblast
- Coordinates: 48°37′2″N 25°57′26″E
- Country: Ukraine
- Oblast: Ternopil Oblast
- Raion: Chortkiv Raion
- Hromada: Zalishchyky urban hromada
- Time zone: UTC+2 (EET)
  - Summer (DST): UTC+3 (EEST)
- Postal code: 48663

Synkiv (Ukrainian: Синьків) is a village in Zalishchyky urban hromada, Chortkiv Raion, Ternopil Oblast, Ukraine.

== History ==
It was first mentioned in writings in 1427.

After the liquidation of the Zalishchyky Raion on 19 July 2020, the village became part of the Chortkiv Raion.

== Religion ==
- Saint Nicholas church; 1883, brick),
- wooden Church of the Nativity of the Blessed Virgin Mary (18th century, restored in 1882; destroyed in the 1970s).

== Sources ==
- (in Ukrainian) Олійник В., Підгірний Д., Синьків // Ternopil Encyclopedic Dictionary: in 4 v. / editorial board: H. Yavorskyi and other, Ternopil: "Zbruch", 2008, V. 3: П—Я, S. 258–259. — ISBN 978-966-528-279-2.
- "Sinków". Geographical Dictionary of the Kingdom of Poland (in Polish). 10. Warszawa: Kasa im. Józefa Mianowskiego. 1889. p. 621.
