= Ilya Segal =

Ilya R. Segal

Academic background
- Education: Moscow Institute of Physics and Technology (BA 1991) Harvard University (PhD 1995)
- Doctoral advisor: Eric Maskin; Oliver Hart; Andrei Shleifer

Academic work
- Discipline: Microeconomics
- Institutions: Stanford University (1999–present); University of California, Berkeley (1995–1999)

Ilya R. Segal is an economist who is Roy and Betty Anderson Professor in the Department of Economics at Stanford University. His research focuses on microeconomic theory, particularly contract theory, mechanism design and auction design. His research interests include the design of competition policy, property rights, contracts, auctions, and other economic mechanisms. Segal has been elected to the American Academy of Arts and Sciences, is a Fellow of the Econometric Society and member of the Toulouse Network for Information Technology. His other awards include Compass Lexecon prize for “the most significant contribution to the understanding and implementation of competition policy,” a Guggenheim Fellowship, a fellowship at the Institute for Advanced Study at Princeton, an Alfred P. Sloan Research Fellowship, and a Hoover Fellowship.

== Biography ==
Segal obtained his MS in applied mathematics from the Moscow Institute of Physics and Technology in 1991 and PhD in economics from Harvard University in 1995. He joined the University of California, Berkeley shortly after receiving his PhD in 1995 and worked as an assistant professor of economics until 1998 before moving to Stanford University in 1999 as an assistant professor of economics and professor in the humanities and sciences since 2002. Segal has also received a courtesy appointment at the Stanford Graduate School of Business in 2004. He has been foreign editor of The Review of Economic Studies since 2010, associate editor of Econometrica since 2015 and editor-in-chief of ACM Transactions on Multimedia Computing, Communications, and Applications since 2017, and was associate editor of Journal of Economic Theory in the period 2013–2015.

Segal was awarded a Guggenheim Fellowship in the period 2002–2003. He was elected an Economic Theory Fellow of the Society for the Advancement of Economic Theory in 2013 and member of the American Academy of Arts and Sciences in 2017.

== Selected publications ==
- Segal, I. (1999). "Contracting with externalities ". The Quarterly Journal of Economics, 114 (2), pp. 337–388.
- Segal, I. (1999). "Complexity and renegotiation: A foundation for incomplete contracts". The Review of Economic Studies, 66 (1), pp. 57–82.
- Segal, I. (2000). "Naked exclusion: comment". The American Economic Review, 90 (1), pp. 296–309.
- Milgrom, P. & I. Segal (2002). "Envelope theorems for arbitrary choice sets". Econometrica, 70 (2), pp. 583–601.
- Segal, I. (2003). "Optimal pricing mechanisms with unknown demand". The American Economic Review, 93 (3), pp. 509–529.
- Nisan, N. & I. Segal (2006). "The communication requirements of efficient allocations and supporting prices". Journal of Economic Theory, 129 (1), pp. 192–224.
- Segal, I. & M. D. Whinston (2007). "Antitrust in innovative industries". The American Economic Review, 97 (5), pp. 1703–1730.
- Rayo, L. & I. Segal (2010). "Optimal information disclosure ". Journal of Political Economy, 118 (5), pp. 949–987.
- Athey, S. & I. Segal (2013). "An efficient dynamic mechanism". Econometrica, 81 (6), pp. 2463–2485.
- Pavan, A.; Segal, I. & J. Toikka (2014). "Dynamic mechanism design: A myersonian approach ". Econometrica, 82 (2), pp. 601–653.
