= Oleksandr Turchynov =

Ukrainian politician (born 1964)

- Олександр Турчинов
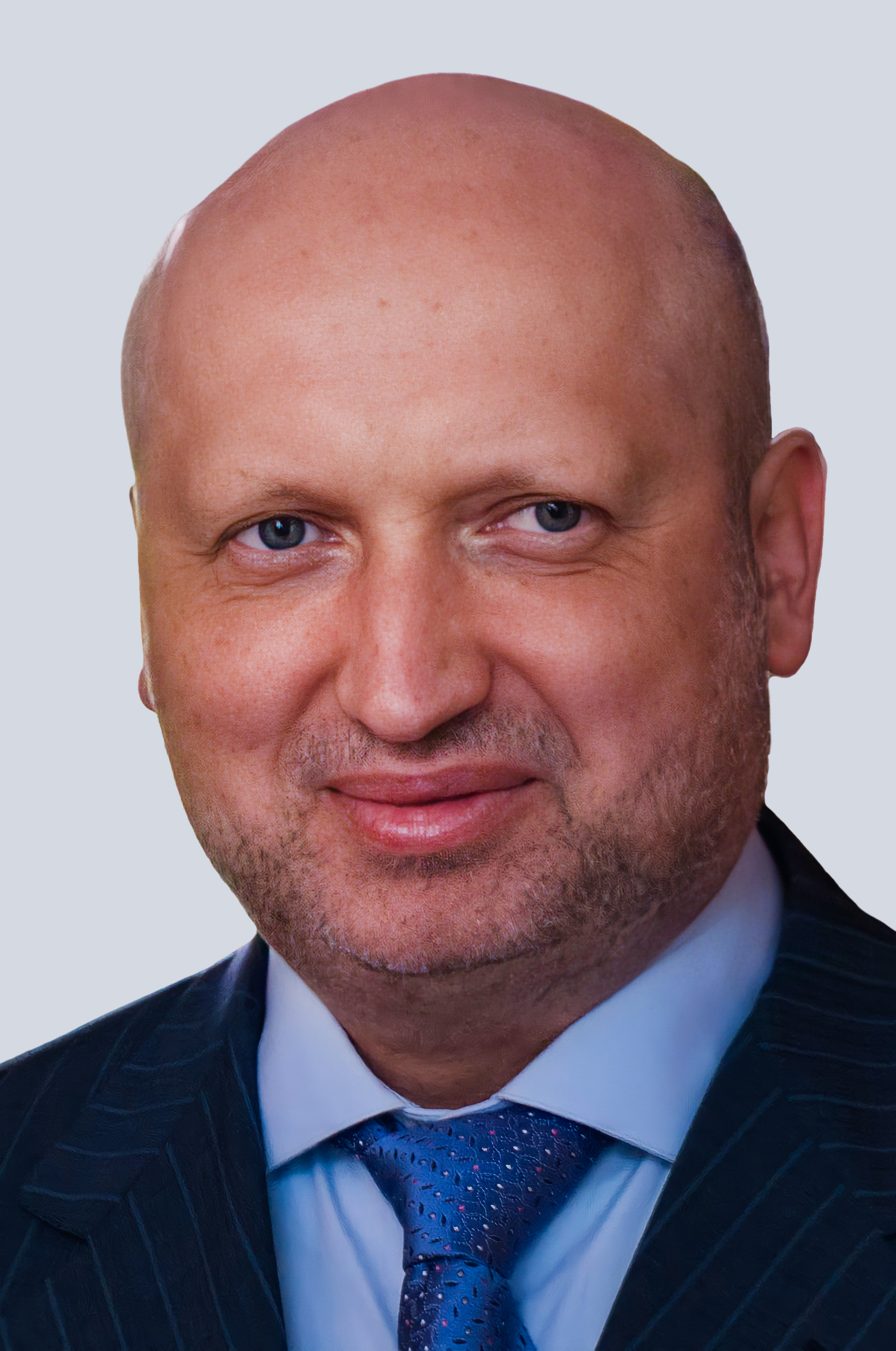
- Turchynov in 2014

Secretary of the National Security and Defence Council
- In office 16 December 2014 – 19 May 2019
- President: Petro Poroshenko
- Preceded by: Andriy Parubiy
- Succeeded by: Oleksandr Danylyuk

President of Ukraine
- Acting; 23 February 2014 – 7 June 2014
- Prime Minister: Himself (acting); Arseniy Yatsenyuk
- Preceded by: Viktor Yanukovych
- Succeeded by: Petro Poroshenko

Prime Minister of Ukraine
- Acting; 22 February 2014 – 27 February 2014
- President: Himself (acting)
- Preceded by: Serhiy Arbuzov (acting)
- Succeeded by: Arseniy Yatsenyuk
- Acting; 4 March 2010 – 11 March 2010
- President: Viktor Yanukovych
- Preceded by: Yulia Tymoshenko
- Succeeded by: Mykola Azarov

Director of the Security Service of Ukraine
- In office 4 February 2005 – 8 September 2005
- President: Viktor Yushchenko
- Prime Minister: Yulia Tymoshenko
- Preceded by: Ihor Smeshko
- Succeeded by: Ihor Drizhchanyi

Chairman of the Verkhovna Rada
- In office 22 February 2014 – 27 November 2014
- President: Himself (acting); Petro Poroshenko
- Preceded by: Volodymyr Rybak
- Succeeded by: Volodymyr Groysman

People's Deputy of Ukraine
- In office 12 December 2012 – 14 January 2015
- Constituency: Batkivshchyna, No. 4 (2012–2015); People's Front, No. 3
- In office 12 May 1998 – 19 December 2007
- Constituency: Hromada, No. 12 (1998–2002); Batkivshchyna, No. 7 (2002–2005); Batkivshchyna, No. 2 (2005–2007)

Personal details
- Born: 31 March 1964 (age 62) Dnipropetrovsk, Ukrainian SSR, Soviet Union (now Dnipro, Ukraine)
- Party: European Solidarity (2020–present)
- Other political affiliations: Communist Party of the Soviet Union (1987–1991); Hromada (1994–1999); Batkivshchyna (1999–2014); Yulia Tymoshenko Bloc (2001–2012); Dictatorship Resistance Committee (2011–2014); People's Front (2014–2019)
- Spouse: Hanna Turchynova
- Children: 1
- Education: National Metallurgical Academy of Ukraine
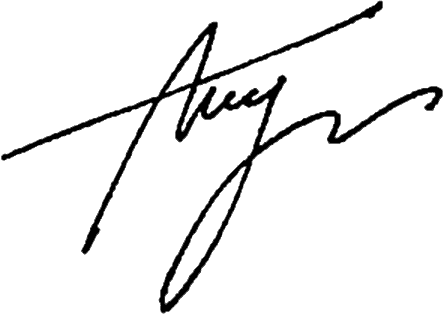
- Signature
- Website: turchynov.com

Military service
- Allegiance: Ukraine

Oleksandr Valentynovych Turchynov (Note: In this name that follows East Slavic naming customs, the patronymic is Valentynovych and the family name is Turchynov.) (Ukrainian: Олександр Валентинович Турчинов, IPA: [olekˈsɑndr wɐlenˈtɪnowɪtʃ tʊrˈtʃɪnou̯]; born 31 March 1964) is a Ukrainian politician, screenwriter, Baptist minister and economist. He is the former Secretary of the National Security and Defence Council of Ukraine.

In 2005, Turchynov served as the head of the Security Service of Ukraine. Turchynov is a former acting President of Ukraine from the removal from power of President Viktor Yanukovych on 21 February 2014, until Petro Poroshenko was sworn in as Ukrainian President on 7 June 2014. He then became Chairman of the Ukrainian Parliament until 27 November 2014. Turchynov also served as acting Prime Minister in 2010 (when he was the First Vice Prime Minister in the absence of a prime minister after Yulia Tymoshenko's government was dismissed on 3 March 2010) until the Verkhovna Rada (Ukrainian parliament) appointed Mykola Azarov as prime minister on 11 March 2010.

Turchynov was the first deputy chairman of the political party Batkivshchyna (All-Ukrainian Union "Fatherland") and a close associate of party leader Yulia Tymoshenko. He started the new political party People's Front in September 2014, now together with Prime Minister Arseniy Yatsenyuk. In June 2020, Turchynov became one of the managers of the headquarters of European Solidarity, a political party led by former president Petro Poroshenko.

== Early life and career ==
Oleksandr Turchynov was born in Dnipropetrovsk (now Dnipro). He graduated from the Dnipropetrovsk Metallurgical Institute in 1986, after which he worked at Kryvorizhstal, a large Ukrainian steel producer. From 1987 to 1990, he served as head of the agitation and propaganda division of the Dnipropetrovsk Oblast Komsomol (Communist Youth League) Committee, which was led by Serhiy Tihipko. Tihipko and Turchynov became political advisers of Leonid Kuchma, then head of Dnipropetrovsk-based Pivdenmash missile manufacturer. Kuchma and his entire team, including Tihipko and Turchynov, moved to Kyiv in 1992, after Kuchma was appointed Prime Minister. In 1993, Turchynov was formally appointed an advisor on economic issues to Prime Minister Kuchma.

Turchynov is a long-time ally of Yulia Tymoshenko, another prominent Ukrainian political figure from Dnipropetrovsk. They used to have a common business in Dnipropetrovsk. In December 1993, Turchynov co-founded and became Vice President of Ukrainian Union of Industrialists and Entrepreneurs. In 1994, he created the political party Hromada together with Pavlo Lazarenko, a business ally of Tymoshenko. Turchynov was also director of the Economic Reforms Institute from January 1994 to March 1998 and was head of the Ukrainian National Academy of Sciences' Laboratory of Shadow Economy Research.

== Political life ==
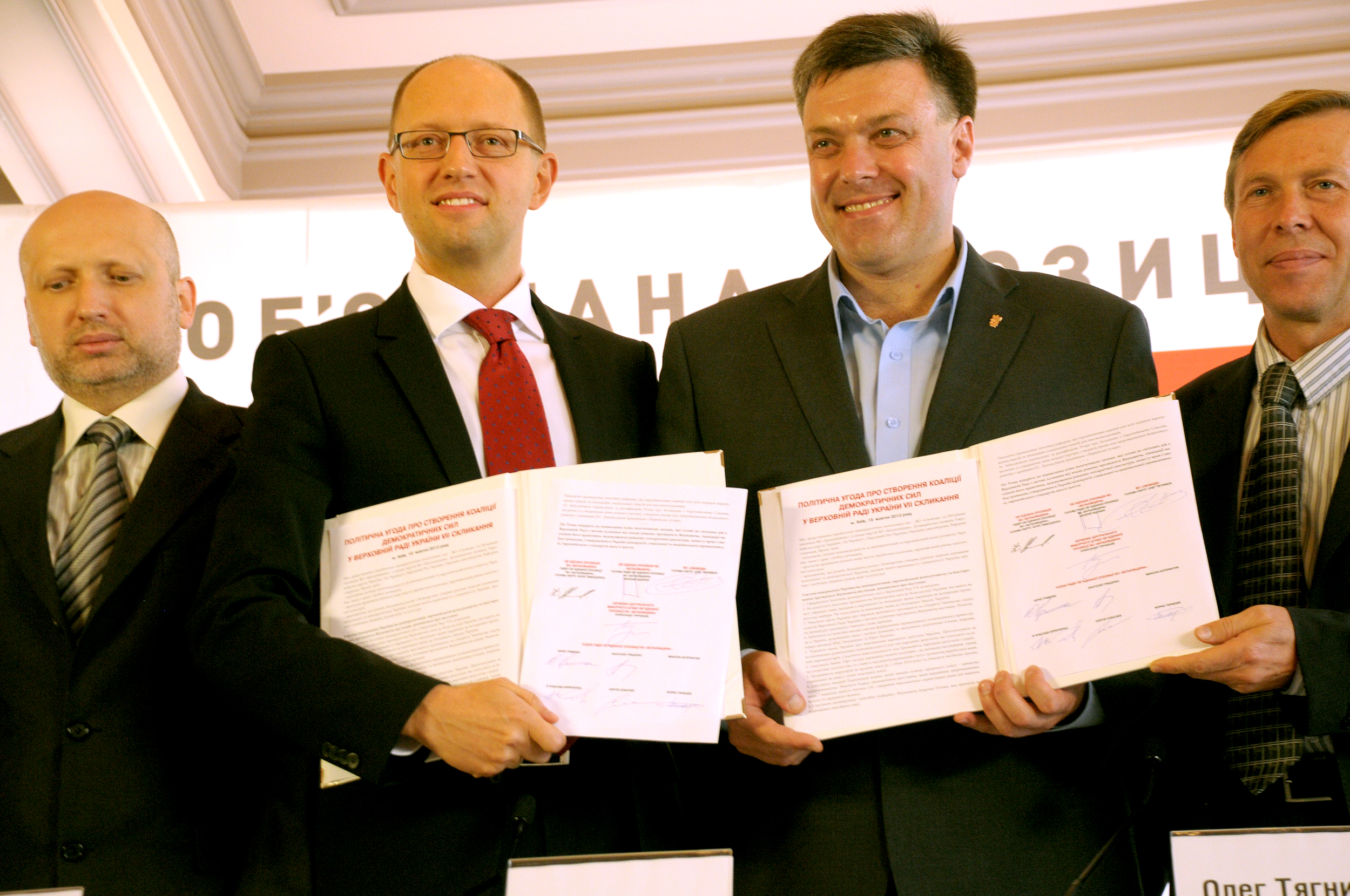
Turchynov, Arseniy Yatsenyuk and Oleh Tyahnybok with coalition agreement before 2012 Ukrainian parliamentary election.

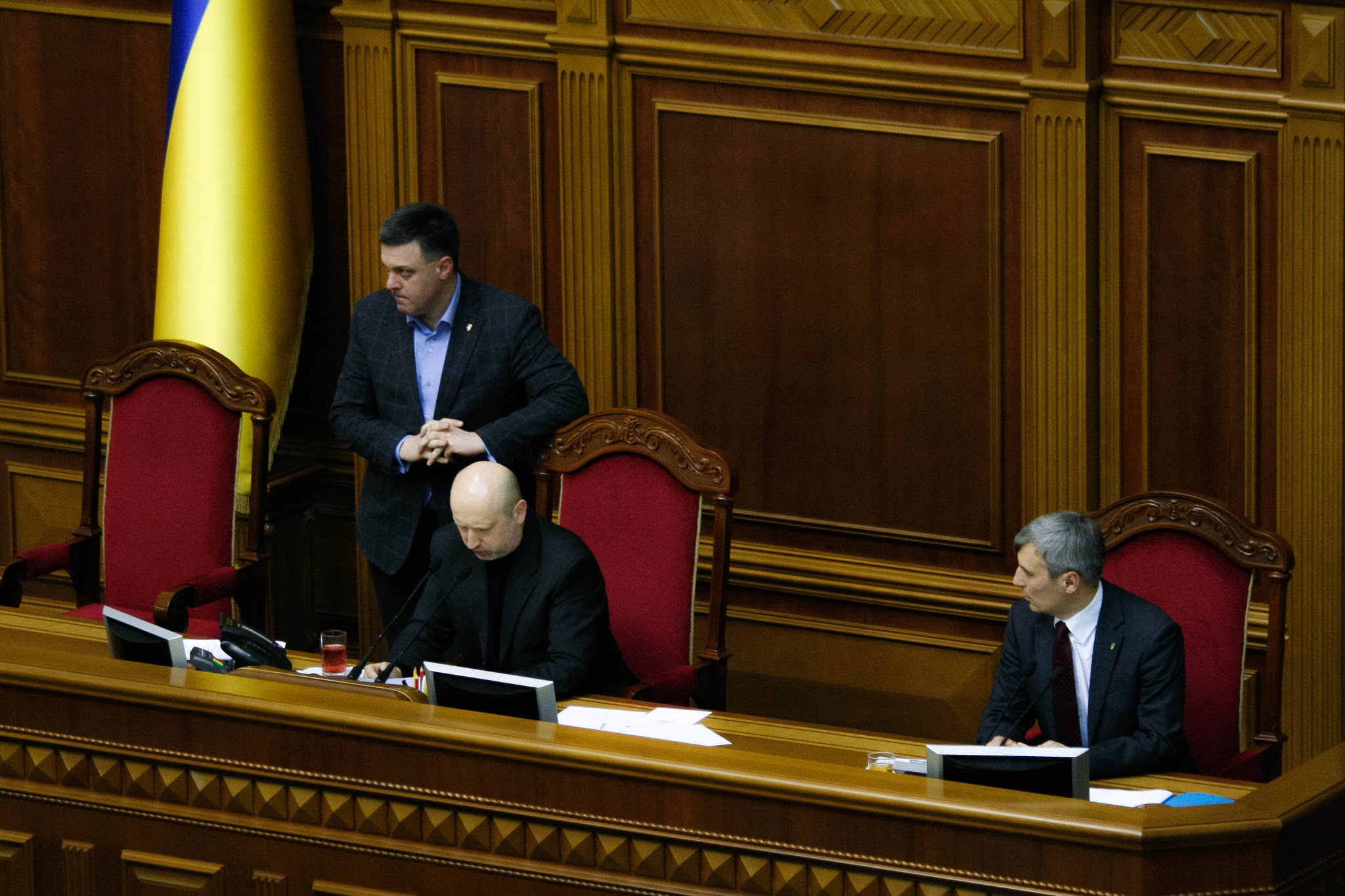
Turchynov and Oleh Tyahnybok in parliament, 24 February 2014

In 1998, he was elected to the Verkhovna Rada as a member of Hromada. Following Lazarenko's flight from Ukraine, he left the faction and party (during May 1999) together with Yulia Tymoshenko's All-Ukrainian Union "Fatherland". He was re-elected to parliament in 2002 and 2006 as part of the BYuT.

On 4 February 2005, Turchynov was appointed and served as the first‐ever civilian head of the Security Service of Ukraine (SBU). With the approval of Turchynov as the head of the SBU, he dissolved the investigation team that was investigating the Georgiy Gongadze case since 2002. According to the first deputy head of the Main Investigation Department of the Prosecutor General's Office of Ukraine Roman Shubin, Turchynov ordered not to provide operational data on the Gongadze case to the investigation group of the Security Service of Ukraine.

On 15 June 2005, after the SBU had started an investigation by Turchynov in May 2005, Tymoshenko charged that Dmytro Firtash and others, including his Nicosia, Cyprus-based Highrock Holdings had been central to over $1 billion stolen from Ukraine through his Turkmenistan gas scheme involving both Eural Trans Gas and RosUkrEnergo. On 8 September 2005, Yushchenko dismissed Tymoshenko and subsequently, on 23 September 2005, the SBU investigation into the missing money was halted by direct order of Yushchenko according to Turchynov.

In August 2007, Turchynov replied to the accusation that his stance on same-sex marriage is typically conservative, "I do not agree. If a man has normal views, then you label him a conservative, but those who use drugs or promote sodomy, you label them a progressive person. All of these are perversions".

In the spring of 2008, he was the Yulia Tymoshenko Bloc and the Our Ukraine–People's Self-Defense Bloc candidate for the Mayor of Kyiv election he placed second at the election with 218,600 votes (19.13% of total vote).

In December 2009, during the 2010 Ukrainian presidential election campaign, Turchynov accused President Viktor Yushchenko and opposition leader Viktor Yanukovych of coordinating their actions in their attempts to topple the Second Tymoshenko Government. From December 2009 until March 2010, the adviser to Turchynov in the Cabinet of Ministers of Ukraine was Andriy Slyusarchuk, a Ukrainian fraudster.

On 4 March 2010, after the fall of the second Tymoshenko Government, Yulia Tymoshenko resigned from her post as prime minister on 4 March 2010, and Turchynov was empowered to fulfill the Prime Minister's duties until a new government was formed. On 11 March 2010, the Azarov Government was elected, and Mykola Azarov was appointed prime minister the same day. According to WikiLeaks, Prosecutor-General of Ukraine Oleksandr Medvedko ordered former Minister of Internal Affairs Yuriy Lutsenko to arrest Yulia Tymoshenko's allies – Oleksandr Turchynov and Andriy Kozhemiakin – for destroying the documents of the Security Service of Ukraine in which the connection between Tymoshenko and the criminal businessman Semion Mogilevich was proven.

In 2012 he was re-elected into the Verkhovna Rada, on the party list of Batkivshchyna. In the final days of Euromaidan, on 21 February 2014 the Verkhovna Rada passed a law that reinstated the 8 December 2004 amendments of the constitution. This was passed under simplified procedure without any decision of the relevant committee and was passed in the first and the second reading in one sitting by 386 deputies. The law was approved by 140 MPs of the Party of Regions, 89 MPs of Batkivshchyna, 40 MPs of UDAR, 32 of the Communist Party, and 50 independent lawmakers. According to Radio Free Europe, however, the measure was not signed by the then-President Viktor Yanukovych, who was subsequently removed from office.

The reinstitution of the 2004 amendments was proscribed in the Agreement on settlement of political crisis in Ukraine to be adopted within 48 hours after signing of the agreement (21 February 2014). All of that was taking place during the already ongoing concealed annexation of Crimea by the Russian Federation and the 2014 Russian military intervention in Ukraine. Under the provision of the Constitution with 2004 amendments, a chairman of parliament is the next in succession of power in the country and such provision existed before adaptation of the Constitution back in 1996.

On 22 February 2014, he was elected as speaker of Verkhovna Rada. On 23 February 2014, Turchynov was designated as interim President of Ukraine following the impeachment of Viktor Yanukovych per the reinstated constitutional provisions of the 2004 amendments. On 25 February Turchynov assumed the (Presidential power of) command of the Ukrainian Armed Forces. A day earlier were also scheduled early presidential elections on 25 May, for which Oleksandr Turchynov did not register. On 27 February, Arseniy Yatsenyuk was appointed the new prime minister under acting president Turchynov.

In early March 2014, Vladimir Putin, President of Russia, stated he did not regard Turchynov as the legitimate Ukrainian President. Following attacks on law enforcement, security institutions and capture of government buildings, Turchynov offered for the unmarked militants with Russian flags to lay down arms and vacate government buildings for negotiations. Upon refusal, he finally sanctioned a big scale anti-terrorist operation headed by the Security Service of Ukraine. Earlier on 8 April 2014 another short-term anti-terrorist operation led by the Ministry of Internal Affairs of Ukraine freed up government buildings in Kharkiv.

On 13 April 2014, Russia confirmed that it began a large scale military exercise in the Rostov, Belgorod and Kursk Oblasts, on the border with Ukraine, involving more than 8,000 troops and which would continue until the end of March. In April 2014, Russia announced another military exercise in the same region (Southern Russia).

On 14 April 2014, while talking on the phone with Secretary-General Ban Ki-moon, Turchynov asked for the United Nations's support regarding the crisis in eastern Ukraine, to which the Secretary-General replied that peacekeepers may be sent in should Russia withhold its veto. Meanwhile, Turchynov issued a deadline to the pro-Russian insurgents to disarm and dismantle their barricades, but the deadline passed without incident. Before he issued a deadline, which was scheduled for 9 am, he tried to negotiate with insurgents and even proposed to hold referendum on the same day as elections which will be on 25 May. His proposition was questioned by journalists who feared that the referendum might be sabotaged by pro-Russia insurgents. Petro Poroshenko was elected President of Ukraine on 25 May 2014. Poroshenko was sworn in as Ukrainian President on 7 June 2014, this ended the presidential powers of Turchynov.

On 10 September 2014, Turchynov became founding member the new party People's Front. In an interview with the BBC, Turchynov admitted that in 2014, when the first volunteers went to war, he was personally giving them weapons, but not all were clean in the eyes of the law: "And I personally signed the orders for the weapons, many were worried about what would happen if they did not follow those orders with a weapons. Indeed, we didn't check anyone at that time, if they were convicted previously or not – whoever said that they are ready to defend the country, signed up, received weapons and went to the East of our country." In an interview given to VICE, he declared concerning his decision: "If it happened again, I would do the same thing". On 21 September 2014, he said that Russia doesn't admit that their soldiers are fighting in Ukraine. He also stated that Russia is the main aggressor, and that during the conflict, Ukraine had lost over 1,000 lives with hundreds missing. During the same Facebook message, he compared the conflict to the butterflies, a metaphor to one of Ray Bradbury's works. Turchynov was elected his party's faction leader on 27 November 2014. On 16 December 2014, President Poroshenko appointed Turchynov as Secretary of the National Security and Defence Council of Ukraine. According to the social poll of the "Sofia" centre, in June 2017, only 0.9% of respondents said that they completely trust Turchynov, 9.5% trust him, 24.1% do not trust him, 57.4% do not trust him at all. On 1 November 2018, Turchynov was included in the Russian sanctions list in connection with Ukraine's unfriendly actions towards citizens and legal entities of the Russian Federation.

On 11 December 2018, in response to the fact that 66 city councils and 12 regional councils had adopted the term "gender" instead of "sex", he published on his website an article he wrote called "Neo-Marxism or a trip to the abyss". In this article he drew a parallel between Marxists and "neo-Marxists", and declared the latter "offe[r] society a struggle for the rights of the new "oppressed", assigning to them the role of emancipated women, homosexuals, lesbians, transgender people, and others like that."

In his article he also criticized LGBT activists and compared the "invented subjects" of gender studies to the academic degrees of "Scientific Communism" and "Marxist-Leninist philosophy". He also called for the restoration of the term "sex" instead of the term "gender" in the national registration where the term "gender" was in use. In response to this, 160 church communities and 130 public organizations publicly supported his article. In March 2019, at the All-Ukrainian Forum of the Family, Turtchynov declared he opposed the "hundreds of genders" in the Ukrainian legislation and declared his support for "eternal gospel values".

On 17 May 2019, after the Ukrainian elections, he resigned from his office as secretary of the NSDC; his resignation was accepted on 19 May. In June 2020, Turchynov became head of the 2020 Ukrainian local elections headquarters of the party European Solidarity. Turchynov stated he was "not interested in a parliamentary mandate or public positions, but to help the unification process and train quality staff of effective managers".

== Business activity ==
On 10 September 2014, Oleksandr Turchynov published a letter in which he urged retailers to take a closer look at the products of Tarasove Dzherelo, a small producer of mineral water. He proposed to conclude deals with that company. Some market experts assessed the actions of Turchynov as lobbyism.

According to the journalistic investigation, Turchynov's mother-in-law, Tamara Beliba, owns the largest data center in the Baltic states — MC-office. Beliba owns the Ekonomikos Institutas company, which owns a data center located in Kaunas, Lithuania. The total volume of investments was $200 million. Tamara Beliba is also the owner of the company "Ekostilkom", which in turn owns a house near Kyiv with a size of 1,000 m^{2} with a plot of land of 0.5 hectares. Turchynov's mother-in-law is the owner of warehouses with a total area of 6,000 m^{2} in Kyiv on the Akademika Koroleva Prospect. Another company of Tamara Beliba owns three facilities with the size of more than 200 m^{2} each in the centre of Kyiv on Konovalets street.

According to the United State Register of Legal Entities, Individual Entrepreneurs and Public Organizations of Ukraine, the entire business in the Turchynov family is executed on his mother-in-law Tamara Beliba, mother Valentina and wife Anna. The family is engaged in economic research, film production, providing communication services and building data centres. This business is related with economic research, film production, the provision of telecommunications services and data centers.

On 1 May 2017, the journalistic investigation of the program Our money with Denis Bigus (channel 24) proved the connection between Oleksandr Turchynov and people's deputy Ruslan Lukyanchuk with three large companies (Absolut Finance, Magnate and Octave Finance) that own 1,200 exchange points of 3,500 legal currency exchange offices in Ukraine. These points exchanged currencies without cash registers, which violates the requirements of the law, since in this case automatic tax reporting is not provided to the State Fiscal Service. All these companies are listed on the nominees — Oksana and Ilona Brodovskaya and Hryhoriy Pron'ko (Oksana's father). However, their connection with the joint business of Turchynov and Lukyanchuk was proved by journalists — Oksana and her husband Valentin Brodovsky were assistants of Ruslan Lukyanchuk during four convocations of the Verkhovna Rada. Investigations on this subject were published in the Ukrainian media earlier.

Oleksandr Turchynov's father-in-law Vladimir Beliba together with businessman Ihor Tynnyy opened in 2013 in the center of Kyiv a restaurant of Italian cuisine "Montecchi v Capuleti". This was reported in May 2016 by the journalists of Nashi hroshi project.

According to media reports, Turchynov is involved in establishment of the following companies: "Institute for Economic Reforms" LLC, "Information Technologies of the 21st Century" CJSC, "Pharmacor" LLC, "ZET" LLC, "Europe-X" LLC, "Editorial board of Vecherniye Vesti newspaper" LLC, "VV" LLC, "SVV" LLC, "Janus" Real Estate Agency LLC.

== Controversies ==
In June 2003, the Deputy Prosecutor General of Ukraine Viktor Shokin announced his intention to send the proposal to the Ukrainian Parliament an idea to bringing to trial the deputies Oleksandr Turchynov, Stepan Khmara and Mykola Rudkovsky. According to Shokin, the People's deputies were insulting and beating the staff of the Lukyanivska Prison. Deputies demanded the release of Gennady Tymoshenko and Antonina Bolyura. They were incriminated with three cases of the Criminal Code: "Capturing state buildings", "Threat to law enforcement officers", and "Excess of power with the use of weapons and verbal insulting of law enforcement officers."

On 13 September 2003, tax officials detained at the office of the "Fatherland" party Ruslan Lukyanchuk, one of the assistants of Oleksandr Turchynov. He was charged with involvement in illegal currency exchange. The Prosecutor General of Ukraine Svyatoslav Piskun then stated that the detention of Turchynov's assistant was part of a planned process of initiating a criminal case. According to Piskun, about hundreds of thousands of illegally converted dollars were sent to the office of the "Fatherland" party.

In February 2006, state prosecutors opened a criminal case against Turchynov and his SBU deputy Andriy Kozhemyakin for destroying a file about FBI Ten Most Wanted Fugitive, organized crime boss Semyon Mogilevich, from the SBU archive. The case was dismissed four months later. WikiLeaks documents mention Turchynov, then head of Ukraine's SBU, as having destroyed documents implicating Yulia Tymoshenko's alleged connections to Mogilevich.

According to the Komsomolskaya Pravda in Ukraine newspaper referring to deputy mayor of Kyiv Leonid Chernovetskyi, Mr. Turchynov is related to unlawful construction in the Landscape Alley (Peyzazhna aleya) district of Kyiv. In autumn of 2004 the Ministry of Foreign Affairs of Ukraine signed an investment contract with JSC Ukrainian Property (OAO "Ukrayinsʹke mayno") on the construction of an apartment building in this district. With this the share of the MFA in the project made just 20%. The Ministry actually became a cover for the businessmen.

As of 1 January 2007, 91.1% of the JSC Ukrainian Property shares belonged to Eclad Invest Ltd. (USA), and 8.2% to Valery Kovalenko. Previously, the shares of JSC Ukrainian Property belonged to JSC Financial holding "L-Holding", the largest shareholder of which was JSC Centre of Financial Technologies. Oleksandr Turchynov owned 26.2% of the shares of this company. On 23 April 2008, the Kyiv District Administrative Court ruled that Oleksandr Turchynov had no personal relationship with the construction of the Landscape Valley.

In 2005, Oleksandr Turchynov ordered to organize an illegal wiretapping of the journalist of Segodnya newspaper Oleksandr Korchinsky. This fact was made public at a press conference by Viktor Shokin, former Prosecutor General of Ukraine. The telephone of the journalist was tapped from 25 June – 12 July 2005. Turchynov personally took this decision. The journalist's phone was bugged without sanctions of the court. On 14 March 2006, the Prosecutor General's Office of Ukraine have opened a criminal case on the fact of illegal wiretapping of senior officials. Most of these wiretapping took place in 2005, when Oleksandr Turchynov was the head of SSU.

In August 2016, journalists of the Economichna Pravda (Ukrayinska Pravda project) accused Oleksandr Turchynov of influencing the leadership of the State Special Communications Service of Ukraine (DSTSZI). Despite the introduction of the system of electronic declarations on the incomes of civil servants and officials, those declarations without a DSTSZI's security certificate could not have legal force in court cases. A number of analysts accused Turchynov of disrupting the launch of the e-declaration system.

On 15 August 2016, Serhiy Kaplin, Secretary of the Committee for National Security and Defense of the Verkhovna Rada, published an open appeal to the National Anti-Corruption Bureau of Ukraine and the Prosecutor General demanding to confirm the attitude of Oleksandr Turchynov to private arms manufacturers. Turchynov actively lobbies the entry of these manufacturers to the market. Kaplin also demands the Prosecutor General to open cases against Turchynov and Serhiy Pashynskyi on the surrender of Crimea and Donbas.

In March 2017, former people's deputy Oleksandr Shepelev accused Turchynov and Ruslan Lukyanchuk of stealing and withdrawing $800 million from the state budget with the assistance of the International Monetary Fund. According to Shepelev, in 2009 Turchynov and Lukyanchuk "were taxed by the heads of ministries and state enterprises", and received money from them to the accounts of the European Bank for Rational Financing (EBRD). There, hryvnias were converted into the cash dollars, which then were withdrawn to offshores through the Baltic banks and shell companies. The largest of these companies was Fortex, owned by Lukyanchuk and registered in the UK. Turchynov urged the NABU to investigate the charges against him.

According to the Ukrainian lawyer living in Russia and disgraced former First Deputy Prosecutor General of Ukraine Renat Kuzmin, the court ordered National Anti-Corruption Bureau of Ukraine to initiate the criminal proceedings against Turchynov for theft and withdrawal of $800 million to offshore companies. The NSDC press service said that Kuzmin's publication contains false information that "Russian secret services are replicating in order to discredit the Secretary of the Turchynov Council." Turchynov later appealed to the State Financial Monitoring Service of Ukraine and the National Anti-Corruption Bureau with a request to conduct a check of the statements of the former members of the Yanukovych team hiding out in Russia that he withdrew $800 million from the state budget to the offshore.

== Non-official activities ==
In 2004, Turchynov published a book, that was made into a film Illusion of Fear. The movie was the 2008 Ukrainian submissions for the Academy Award for Best Foreign Language Film.

== Earnings ==
According to an electronic declaration, in 2019, Turchynov received ₴410,690 (US$15,210) as salary. He received interest of ₴1.319 million (US$48,852) from bank deposits. Another ₴250,000 formed an income from other sources. In bank accounts, Turchynov had ₴236,000, US$1,052,000, and about €10,000. He also declared US$675,000, €3,000, and ₴57,000 in cash.

Turchynov has a collection of ancient Bibles, paintings, as well as copyrights to books and films. His spouse has declared ₴446,000 of income. Oleksandr Turchynov also declared a 2018 TOYOTA LC 150 Prado car and a 2015 LEXUS LX570 car.

== Awards ==
On 31 October 2014, at the ceremony of rewarding the participants of the war in Donbas, the head of the Ministry of Internal Affairs of Ukraine Arsen Avakov awarded Turchynov a compact self-loading pistol PSM-05 for services to the ministry. The Minister expressed the hope that he will assist the Ministry in the future.

Turchynov also has three more award weapons - a revolver of Alfa 3541 caliber .357 Magnum (30 April 2014), a pistol machine gun Fort-226 (30 March 2015), and a semi-automatic pistol Mauser C96 with 105 bullets.

In May 2016, Minister of Internal Affairs of Ukraine Arsen Avakov confirmed that Turchynov was awarded the Maxim's machine gun model 1910 (PM M1910).

On 2 May 2018, by the decree of the President of Ukraine, he was awarded the Order of Prince Yaroslav the Wise of the Fifth Class.

== Personal life ==
Oleksandr Turchynov's wife, Hanna Turchynova (born 1970) works as dean of the faculty of natural geography and ecology at National Pedagogical Dragomanov University. They have one son, Kyrylo (born 1994), who finished his master's degree thesis in 2014.

Turchynov is known to abstain from tobacco and alcohol. He belongs to the 1.9% of Ukraine's population that identify as Protestant. Although some in the media have labelled him a pastor, the Associated Baptist Press and the European Baptist Federation report that he is an elder and occasional lay preacher at his Kyiv church, the Word of Life Center, which is a member of the Evangelical Baptist Union of Ukraine. Social networks have nicknamed him the "Bloody Pastor" (Ukrainian: Кривавий пастор). He responds to this nickname with irony: "I think this nickname is much better than what the Ukrainians gave to Putin". Some media occasionally regard Turchynov as the "Consigliere of Yulia Tymoshenko".

== Notes ==
Government offices
Preceded by Ihor Smeshko	Director of the Security Service; 2005	Succeeded by Ihor Drizhchany
Preceded by Andriy Parubiy	Secretary of the National Security and Defense Council; 2014–2019	Succeeded by Oleksandr Danylyuk
Political offices
Preceded by Mykola Azarov	Deputy Prime Minister of Ukraine; 2007–2010	Succeeded by Andriy Klyuyev
Preceded by Yulia Tymoshenko	Prime Minister of Ukraine; Acting; 2010	Succeeded by Mykola Azarov
Preceded by Serhiy Arbuzov; Acting	Prime Minister of Ukraine; Acting; 2014	Succeeded by Arseniy Yatsenyuk
Preceded by Volodymyr Rybak	Chairman of the Verkhovna Rada; 2014	Succeeded by Volodymyr Groysman
Preceded by Viktor Yanukovych	President of Ukraine; Acting; 2014	Succeeded by Petro Poroshenko
