= ARETI International Group =

Swiss energy company

- Type: Private
- Industry: Oil and gas
- Founded: 2015
- Headquarters: Geneva, Switzerland
- Number of locations: Switzerland, United States, Canada, Cyprus
- Area served: Commonwealth of Independent States
- Key people: Igor Makarov (Founder)
- Products: Natural gas Petroleum
- Services: Energy
- Website: www.aretigroup.com

ARETI International Group is a private energy company headquartered in Geneva, Switzerland. The ARETI group consists of holding companies registered in Switzerland, Cyprus, the United States and is involved in the energy industry, real estate and cycling development. The company operates primarily in Switzerland and the Commonwealth of Independent States (CIS) countries. ARETI was created by Igor Makarov in 2015 following his sale of Itera International Group of Companies, which was started in 1992 and sold off in 2013, when Itera's main subsidiary, Itera Oil & Gas Company, was acquired by Rosneft prior to any sanctions placed on Rosneft.

== History of ARETI International Group ==
ARETI is a Swiss-based company which was founded by Igor Makarov in 2015, focusing on investments in various sectors in Western Europe, the US, Canada and Central Asia.

Approximately in 2016, ARETI made investments into Inception Exploration Ltd., a Calgary based oil and gas exploration company in Canada, in particular, in early 2017, Inception Exploration reported raising financing from Swiss investor.

In 2019, ARETI announced its plans to participate in oil and gas projects in Turkmenistan, including development of Uzynda oil field and Block 21 of Turkmen sector of the Caspian Sea.

In March 2021, Spartan Delta Corp., a Canadian oil and gas producer acquired Inception Exploration and oil and gas assets for $148 million, while ARETI became Spartan Delta's largest shareholder. In February 2021, Spartan Delta reported to issue 23.7 million common shares to Inception shareholders at a deemed price of $3.83, for a total of $90.8 million. It is also to issue a $50-million promissory note to an Inception debtholder that will be convertible to common shares two years after the deal closes. The additions were expected to boost Spartan’s 2021 production by 20 per cent to about 36,000 barrels of oil equivalent per day from prior guidance of about 30,000 boe/d.

In March 2022, ARETI sold more than half its stake in Spartan Delta for C$121.5 million to generate immediate liquidity and to reduce its overall economic exposure to Spartan, retaining about 8% in the company.

In May 2025, ARETI International Group publicly confirmed that it had suspended all business activities in Turkmenistan in 2022 and, as of April 2025, had formally and legally completed its full withdrawal from the country, with no remaining operational presence, affiliated entities, or commercial interests.
