= List of disasters in Ukraine by death toll =

The list of disasters in Ukraine by death toll includes major disasters and accidents – excluding warfare and other intentional acts – that took place on Ukrainian soil, involved the Ukrainian military, or the victims were predominantly Ukrainians or Ukrainian citizens.

== Over 100 confirmed deaths ==
Disaster	Type	Location	Deaths	Date	Ref.
Kurenivka mudslide	Mudflow	Kyiv	145 (officially) – 1500 (later unofficial investigations)	13 March 1961	
1979 Dniprodzerzhynsk mid-air collision	Aviation accident	Near Kamianske	178	11 August 1979	
Pulkovo Aviation Enterprise Flight 612	Aviation accident	Sukha Balka, Donetsk Oblast	170	22 August 2006	
Aeroflot Flight 1491	Aviation accident	Kharkiv	122	18 May 1972	
2007 Zasyadko mine disaster	Mining accident	Donetsk	101	18 November 2007	

== 40 to 99 confirmed deaths ==
Disaster	Type	Location	Deaths	Date	Ref.
1985 Zolochiv mid-air collision	Aviation accident	Near Zolochiv, Lviv Oblast	94	3 May 1985	
Siberia Airlines Flight 1812	Aviation accident	Black Sea	78	4 October 2001	
Sknyliv air show disaster	Aviation accident	Lviv Danylo Halytskyi International Airport	77	27 July 2002	
Aeroflot Flight 1969	Aviation accident	Luhansk International Airport	65	31 March 1971	
Aeroflot Flight N-826	Aviation accident	Preobrazhenky, Dnipropetrovsk Oblast	55	3 August 1969	
Aeroflot Flight 1802	Aviation accident	Viktorivka, Chernihiv Raion, Chernihiv Oblast	52	15 May 1976	
Malév Flight 110	Aviation accident	Near Boryspil International Airport	49	16 September 1971	
Aeroflot Flight N-63	Aviation accident	Near Havryshivka Vinnytsia International Airport	48	12 November 1971	
Aeroflot Flight N-36	Aviation accident	Kyiv International Airport (Zhuliany)	48	17 December 1976	
Chernobyl disaster	Nuclear accident	Chernobyl	45–64	26 April 1986	
Marhanets train accident	Traffic collision	Marhanets	45	12 October 2010	
Korystivka station train accident	Train wreck	Korystivka	44	6 November 1986	
Aeroflot Flight 315 (1959)	Aviation accident	Lviv Danylo Halytskyi International Airport	40	16 November 1959	

== 20 to 39 confirmed deaths ==
Disaster	Type	Location	Deaths	Date	Ref.
Aeroflot Flight 3630	Aviation accident	Near Dnipro	37	2 September 1970	
2015 Zasyadko mine disaster	Mining accident	Donetsk	34	4 March 2015	
Korsun Mine No.1 accident	Mining accident	Horlivka	33	13 March 1917	
1960 Lviv An-10 crash	Aviation accident	Lviv	32	26 February 1960	
2011 Ukraine mine accidents	Mining accident	Molodohvardiisk and Makiivka	29	29 July 2011	
Aeroflot Flight 036	Aviation accident	Tarasovychi, Kyiv Oblast	27	17 August 1960	
2008 Yevpatoria gas explosion	Gas explosion	Yevpatoria	27	24 December 2008	
2020 Chuhuiv An-26 crash	Aviation accident	Highway M03 near Chuhuiv Air Base	26	25 September 2020	
2007 Dnipro apartment building explosion	Gas explosion	Dnipro	23	13 October 2007	
Borki train disaster	Train wreck	Birky, Chuhuiv Raion, Kharkiv Oblast	21	29 October 1888	

== 10 to 19 confirmed deaths ==
Disaster	Type	Location	Deaths	Date	Ref.
December 2019 Odesa fire	Structure fire	Odesa	16	4 December 2019	
2021 Kharkiv fire	Structure fire	Kharkiv	15	21 January 2021	
2023 Brovary helicopter crash	Aviation accident	Brovary	14	18 February 2023	
2008 Ukraine coal mine collapse	Mining accident	Yenakiieve	13	8 June 2008	
Vyry bus–train collision	Traffic collision	Vyry, Sumy Oblast	12	4 February 2014	

== Fewer than 10 confirmed deaths ==
Disaster	Type	Location	Deaths	Date	Ref.
Aeroflot Flight N-528	Aviation accident	Berdiansk Airport	8	19 June 1987	
Stepova mine explosion	Mining accident	Hlukhiv, Lviv Oblast	8	2 March 2017	
1995 Borodianka mid-air collision	Aviation accident	Borodianka Raion	7	10 February 1995	
Odesa psychiatric hospital fire	Structure fire	Odesa	7	10 June 2019	
Kriachky oil depot fire	Structure fire	Kriachky, Kyiv Oblast	6	8 June 2015	
2013 Horlivka chemical accident	Chemical accident	Horlivka	5	6 August 2013	
South Airlines Flight 8971	Aviation accident	Donetsk International Airport	5	13 February 2013	
Ukraine Air Alliance Flight 4050	Aviation accident	Lviv	5	4 October 2019	
Zaporizhia Regional Infectious Diseases Clinical Hospital fire	Structure fire	Zaporizhzhia	4	3–4 February 2021	
Camp Viktoriia fire	Structure fire	Odesa	3	16 September 2017	
2024 Black Sea oil spill	Shipwrecking	Kerch Strait	1	15 December 2024	

== See also ==
- List of disasters in Antarctica by death toll
- List of disasters in Canada by death toll
- List of disasters in Croatia by death toll
- List of disasters in Germany by death toll
- List of disasters in Great Britain and Ireland by death toll
- List of disasters in New Zealand by death toll
- List of disasters in Poland by death toll
- List of disasters in Sweden by death toll
- List of disasters in the United States by death toll
