= Azot =

Azot may refer to:

- Azot (region), an historical and geographic region in North Macedonia
- Ahuizotl (AZOT), a gene involved in removing aged damaged cells in organisms
- Azote, the French name for nitrogen, also used in many other languages
- Chemical plants in Ukraine:
  - Azot (Cherkasy)
  - Azot (Sievierodonetsk)
  - Rivneazot, located in Rivne
