= 2013 Horlivka chemical accident =

2013 ammonia leak in Horlivka, Ukraine

An industrial chemical accident occurred on 6 August 2013 at the private limited company Concern Stirol JSC, part of Ostchem Holding AG, in the city of Horlivka, Ukraine. Ammonia was released in the air and five people were killed and 23 people were injured from exposure to the gas. Of these, 22 people were hospitalized burns and poisoning.

== Before the incident ==
Concern Stirol, JSC, was founded in 1933. It is the largest mineral fertilizer producer in Ukraine. In September 2010, Concern Stirol became part of OSTCHEM holding controlled by Group DF founded and owned by Ukrainian businessman Dmitry Firtash.

On 26 May 2013 a fire took place in a workshop for the compression of ammonia at the plant, destroying 100 square metres (1,075 square feet) of floor structure and damaging one gas compressor. The fire was extinguished within 1.5 hours.

Locals claim that ammonia emissions occur quite often.

== Ammonia Release ==
At 14:00 on 6 August 2013, during the overhaul of plant №1 at the Stirol chemical plant, while depressurizing an ammonia reservoir, a liquid ammonia pipe with a diameter of 150 mm (5.9 in) and a working pressure of 12 atmospheres was damaged and gas ammonia escaped. A white cloud appeared at the plant and quickly spread.

According to witnesses, there was a panic in the workshop after the accident because people were unable to wear masks, which were rated for only 5 minutes of breathing.

The company Rescue Service completely stopped ammonia output within 20 minutes. The accident released 600 kg (1,323 lb) of ammonia into the air.

== Consequences ==
=== Accident victims ===
According to initial reports, two people were killed, three were injured. The final death toll was five, including a foreman–fitter, three fitters and an electric and gas welder.

Overall 23 people underwent medical care, with 22 admitted to two city hospitals (№ 2 and № 3) of Horlivka. Later, five people were transferred for treatment to the Donetsk Regional Clinical Territorial Medical University. At the same time the Head of the Donetsk Regional State Administration Andriy Shishatskiy said that 21 people were hospitalized.

Among the residents of Horlivka there were no medical consultations regarding ammonia toxicity.

=== The ecological situation ===
In the first hours after the incident in the city an unpleasant ammonia smell was reported. People began to take shelter indoors and shut windows, but no official information had been received.

Later, Directorate of Civil Protection of Horlivka City Council published information that the accident didn't pose a threat to people. Later the Horlivka sanitary and epidemiological station confirmed that the maximum permissible concentration of ammonia in air was not exceeded at 500 and 1000 meters from the plant.

== Investigation ==
Prosecutor of Horlivka Oleg Kolesnyk and an investigative team went to the site of the accident. According to preliminary data, a rupture of an ammonia pipeline occurred. Criminal proceedings under Chapter 2 of Article 272 (violation of safety rules during work with high-risk) of the Criminal Code of Ukraine was started. The public prosecutor's office of Horlivka provides procedural guidance for the course of preliminary investigations. Violation of this article carries a maximum punishment of eight years in prison.

After the accident, Deputy Prime Minister Yuriy Boyko and Minister of Environment and Natural Resources Oleh Proskuryakov, Deputy Attorney General Anatolyi Pryshko and representatives of Ministry of Internal Affairs and Security Service of Ukraine went to Horlivka. Also the situation was monitored under the control of the President of Ukraine Viktor Yanukovych

During the pipeline inspection a crack length of 10 cm (3.9 in) was revealed, through which ammonia had leaked. Also three basic versions of the causes of the accident was formulated: incorrect operation of equipment, safety violations or human negligence. In addition, the company did not immediately notify the appropriate authorities of the accident.

=== Estimates of the accident ===
Prosecutor of Horlivka, Oleg Kolesnyk, on the day of the accident said that all causes should be considered, including the human factor, or a violation of a process. He added that it was too early to say what was the cause. A similar view was expressed by the chairman of the State Emergency Service Mykhaylo Bolotskykh. He added that there is no threat to people or the environment. According to the Minister of Environment and Natural Resources, Oleh Proskuryakov, the first conclusions of the Commission on the causes of the accident would be announced by the end of the week. Concern Stirol will provide UAH 5 million in compensations to the families of the five company employees and cover all cost associated with treatment and rehabilitation of all employees affected by the accident.

== Reaction ==
The President of Ukraine Viktor Yanukovych expressed his condolences to the families of those killed and ordered the government to provide victims with all necessary relief and take steps to improve safety at industrial enterprises of Ukraine

On 7 August 2013 the Prime Minister of Ukraine Mykola Azarov said that all victims will receive assistance and Social Policy Minister Nataliya Korolevska will go to Horlivka to determine the cause of the accident, then a separate meeting of the Cabinet of Ministers will be devoted to this issue.

Head of Donetsk Regional State Administration Andriy Shishatskiy said that there is no reason to panic because the allowable ammonia concentration was not exceeded, and the accident will not affect the work of the plant.

== Follow-up ==
On 7 October 2013, Concern Stirol JSC announced plans to diagnose 14 km (7.4 mi) of its ammonia pipelines and to conduct major repairs and modernization at the No.1 Ammonia Shop.

== See also ==
- 2008 Ukraine coal mine collapse
