= Zasyadko mine disaster =

Zasyadko mine disaster may refer to:

- 2007 Zasyadko mine disaster
- 2015 Zasyadko mine disaster
