= N63 =

N63 may refer to:

== Roads ==
- N63 road (Ireland)
- Dr. Santos Avenue, in Parañaque, Philippines
- Nebraska Highway 63, in the United States

== Other uses ==
- Aeroflot Flight N-63, which crashed in 1971
- BMW N63, an automobile engine
- HMS Tigris (N63), a submarine of the Royal Navy
- London Buses route N63
