= Hlukhiv (disambiguation) =

Hlukhiv is a city in Sumy Oblast, Ukraine.

Hlukhiv (Ukrainian: Глухів) may also refer to:

- Hlukhiv (village), a village in Lviv Oblast, Ukraine
- Hlukhiv Pershii, a village in Zhytomyr Oblast, Ukraine
- Hlukhiv Druhii, a village in Zhytomyr Oblast, Ukraine
