= Sergiy Lishchyna =

Ukrainian businessman

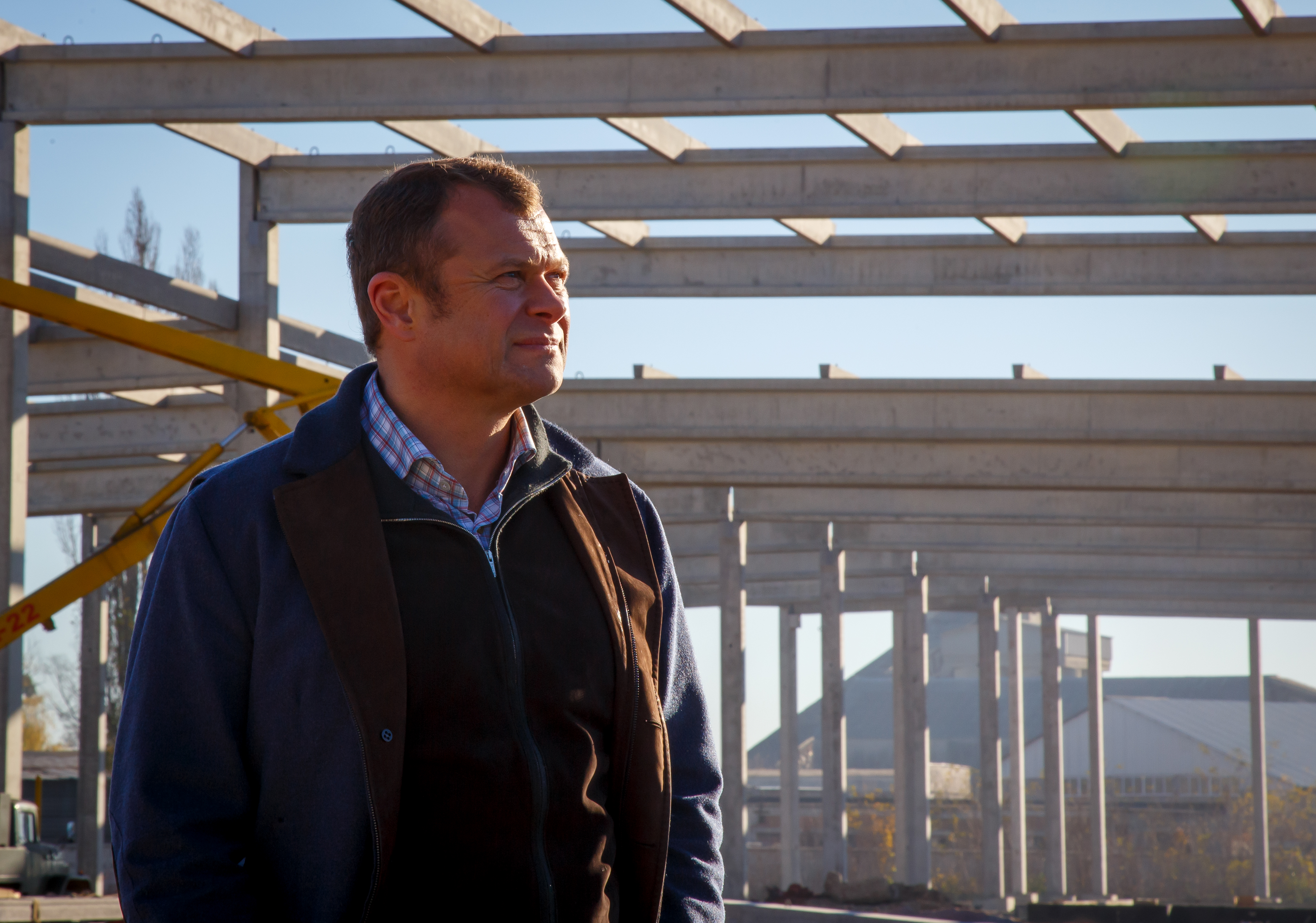
- Born: July 11, 1970 (age 56); Sieverodonetsk, Luhansk Oblast, Ukrainian SSR (now Ukraine)
- Citizenship: Ukraine
- Education: Kharkiv Polytechnic Institute
- Occupation: Businessperson

Sergiy Bogdanovych Lishchyna (Ukrainian: Сергій Богданович Ліщина; born July 11, 1970, Sieverodonetsk, Ukrainian SSR) is a Ukrainian entrepreneur, investor, and philanthropist. He is the co-owner of several industrial enterprises, including TM Izovat, Ukrainian Sawmills, Swisspan, and plywood manufacturing plants in Kostopil and Lviv. Recognized for his commitment to business transparency, Sergiy Lishchyna actively fosters open dialogue between businesses and government to enhance efficiency and stimulate Ukraine’s economic growth. His business philosophy centers on innovation, energy efficiency, and sustainable development.

== Biography ==
=== Early life and education ===
Sergiy Lishchyna was born on July 11, 1970, in Sieverodonetsk. His father Bogdan Mykolayovych Lishchyna was the General Director of the Sieverodonetsk State Manufacturing Enterprise "Azot Association" (Luhansk, Ukraine). He was also a People's Deputy of Ukraine of the 1st convocation, and an academician of the Academy of Engineering Sciences of Ukraine (1991), and served in Ukraine’s inaugural parliament. In 1991, Bogdan Lishchyna was named an academician by Ukraine’s Academy of Engineering Sciences.

In 1993, Sergiy Lishchyna graduated from Kharkiv Polytechnic Institute with a master's degree in chemical sciences.

=== Career ===
Sergiy Lishchyna began his career in the 1990s, initially trading chemical raw materials with China and South Korea. He soon expanded into the construction materials industry, establishing himself as an innovative business leader.

From 1994 to 2003, he held executive roles in both Ukrainian and international companies, overseeing the import, export, and sales of chemical raw materials. Between 2003 and 2014, he served as Deputy Chairman of the board of JSC Wooden Boards and Materials, managing operations in Kostopil, and Nadvirna, significantly contributing to the company’s growth.

In 2006, he co-founded TM Izovat (LLC "OBIO"), a company specializing in thermal insulation materials, particularly basalt-based mineral wool. Located in Zhytomyr, the plant produces around 85,000 tons of mineral wool annually, with plans for an additional 90,000 tons in production capacity. As one of the region’s largest employers, Izovat provides over 450 jobs, and contributes hundreds of millions of hryvnias in taxes each year.

In 2015, Sergiy Lishchyna co-founded Ukrainian Sawmills, Ukraine’s second-largest sawmill operating in sustainable timber production.

Among his latest projects is the construction of a glass wool manufacturing facility, with an investment exceeding €30 million. Launched in 2020, the project is based on sustainable production and circular economy principles, with the facility expected to commence operations in the first half of 2026.

=== Public activities ===
Sergiy Lishchyna has been a longtime supporter of his alma mater, the Kharkiv Polytechnic Institute, and has been involved in supporting cultural and sporting initiatives in his home and business regions. His philanthropy also includes support for wounded soldiers in the ongoing Russo-Ukrainian War.

Since the beginning of the Russo-Ukrainian War, he has consistently provided vital support and essential supplies to the Ukrainian military.

=== Personal life ===
Sergiy Lishchyna is married and has three children. An avid traveler, he has a deep interest in politics, history, and rare book collecting.

He owns a collection of European whiskey and a wine cellar. The selections in these collections are based on his individual choices and specifications.
