= Sievierodonetsk Airport =

Airport in Sievierodonetsk, Ukraine

Sievierodonetsk International Airport Міжнародний Аеропорт Сєвєродонецьк
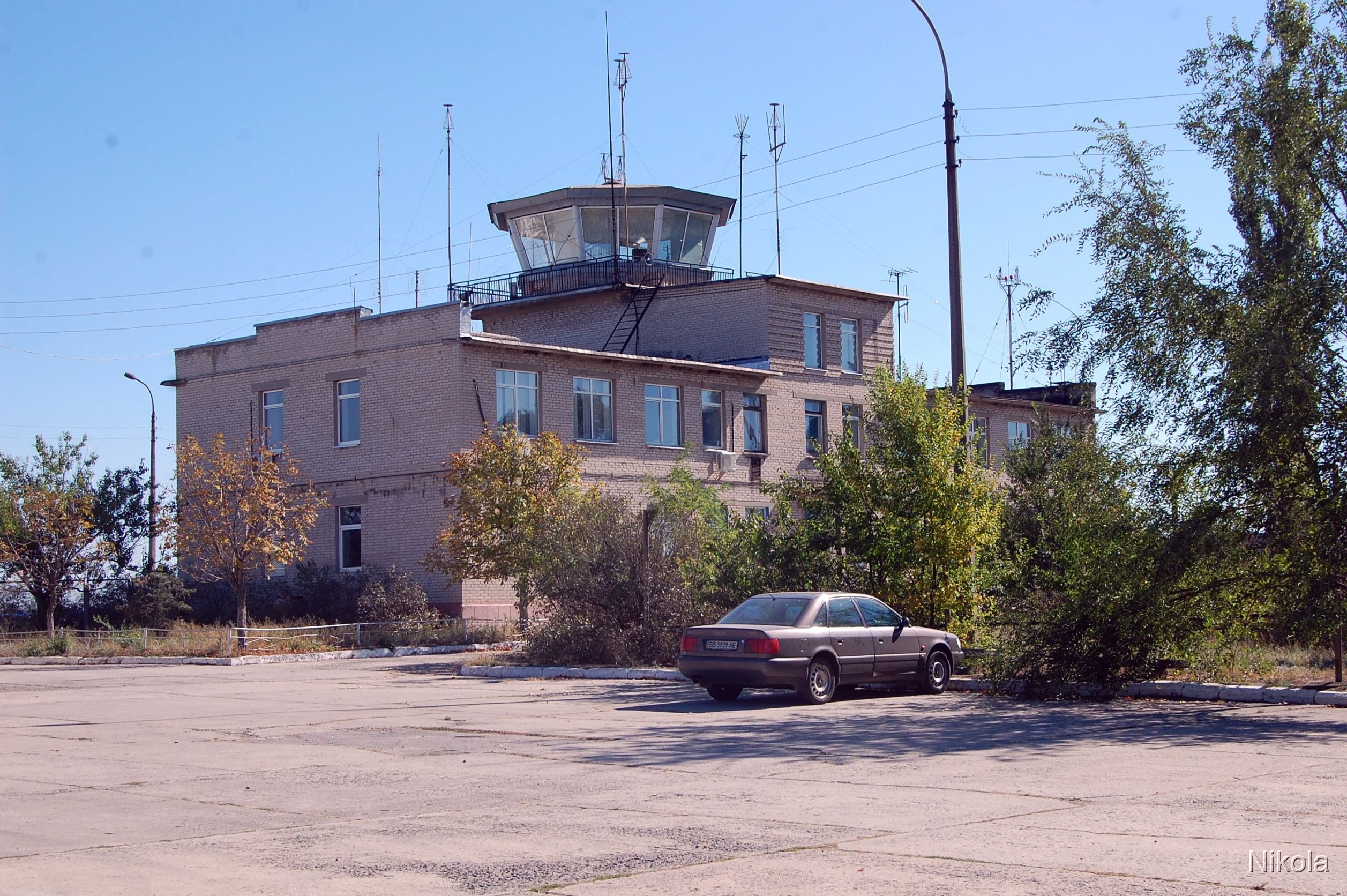
- IATA: SEV; ICAO: UKCS

Summary
- Airport type: Public
- Owner: Sievierodonetsk
- Operator: Ukrtransgaz
- Serves: Luhansk Oblast
- Location: Sievierodonetsk, Luhansk Oblast, Ukraine
- Elevation AMSL: 226 ft (69 m)
- Coordinates: 48°54′5″N 38°32′38″E

Map
- Location of Sievierodonetsk Airport in Ukraine

Runways
Direction	Length		Surface
Direction	m	ft	Surface
15/33	1,420	4,659	concrete

Sievierodonetsk Airport is a closed airport in the city of Sievierodonetsk, Luhansk Oblast in Ukraine. It is relatively small and has one concrete runway which is 1,420 meters in length.

It became the primary airport serving the oblast after Luhansk International Airport was destroyed during the war in the Donbas in 2014. During the 2022 Russian invasion of Ukraine, the airport was severely damaged in the Battle of Sievierodonetsk, rendering it unusable.
