= Ostchem Holding =

Logo of Ostchem Holding for both Latin and Cyrillic languages

Ostchem Holding is a holding company that unites a group of chemical factories and supporting companies. In its turn Ostchem is a part of bigger Group DF that unites several separate enterprises and other holding companies and is owned by Ukrainian oligarch Dmytro Firtash.

On 20 December 2016 Ostchem announced about its mass layoffs.

== Description ==
In the spring of 2011, Ostchem Holding strengthened its position in Ukraine by acquiring the right to import Central Asian gas for chemical companies. In 2011, the company bought gas in Turkmenistan, Uzbekistan and Kazakhstan, importing 4.8 billion cubic meters of fuel a year. But since 2012, Ostchem has been buying gas directly from Gazprom. Ostchem, having supplanted the state monopoly of Naftogaz Ukrainy, received special price conditions for gas supplies. In January, Naftogaz was the only importer of Russian gas to the country, including Ostchem, which bought 2.4 billion cubic meters from Gazprom. But since February 2013, the situation has changed. "Naftogaz bought in Russia only 0.4 billion cubic meters, and Ostchem - 2.4 billion, exceeding its quarterly needs.

It is among world leading companies in production of nitrate, ammonia, and urea. Ostchem made its mother company Group DF third biggest world producer of ammonia in the world in 2013 yielding only to Norwegian Yara International, American CF Industries and surpassing Canadian PotashCorp.

Ostchem includes smaller companies in production of nitrogen fertilizers, their distribution and transportation. Main products include nitrogen fertilizers such as ammonia, urea, ammonium nitrate, CAN (calcium ammonium nitrate), UAN (urea ammonium nitrate), and ammonium sulfate. Beside fertilizers, the factories of the company produce products of organic synthesis and organic acids (adipic and acetic acids, methanol, caprolactam (CPL), vinyl acetate, polystyrol).

== List of production factories ==
- Azot (Cherkasy, Ukraine)
- Stirol (Horlivka, Ukraine)
- Sievierodonetsk Association Azot (Severodonetsk, Ukraine)
- Rivneazot (Rivne, Ukraine)
- Nitrofert (Kohtla-Järve, Estonia)
- Tajik Azot (Dushanbe, Tajikistan)

During the 2022 Russian invasion of Ukraine, the Azot plant in Sievierodonetsk became a key site in the battle of Sievierodonetsk.

== Logistics ==
Distribution of the products is realized through "UkrAhro NPK" that possess the biggest network of agrarian warehouses in Ukraine (accounts for 28).

Transportation of the products outside of Ukraine is conducted through a specialized marine terminal located in Mykolaiv and oscillated into a separate seaport "Nika-Terra" at the northern tip of Dnieper-Bug Estuary.
