= Zasyadko coal mine =

Coal mining company in Donetsk, eastern Ukraine

Coordinates: 48.0523°N 37.7897°E

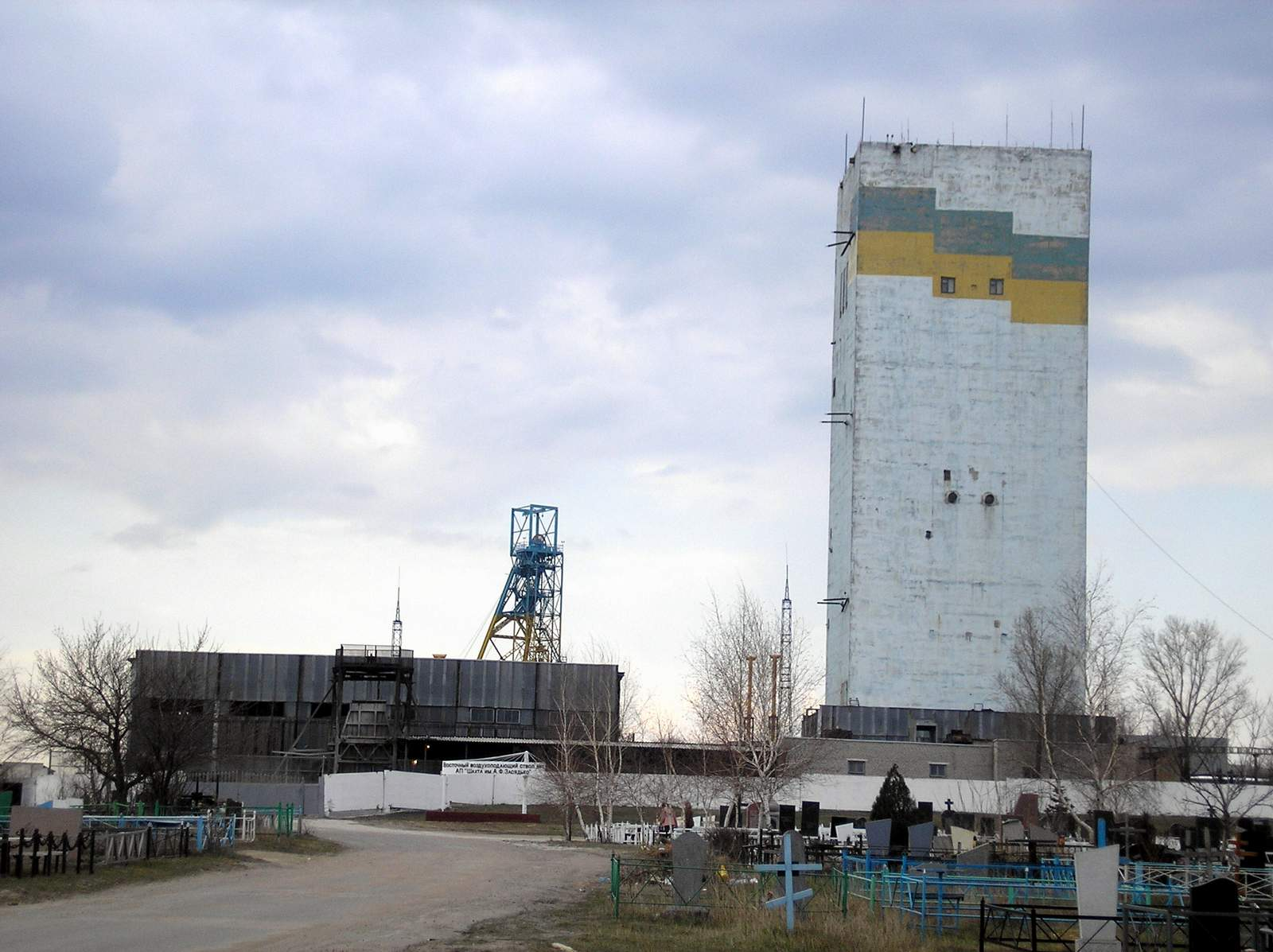
- Eastern shaft of the Zasyadko Mine photographed in 2007. Local cemetery seen on the foreground.
- Interactive map of Zasyadko coal mine
- Location: Donetsk, Ukraine
- Products: Coal
- Opened: December 31, 1958 (as Hilka-Hlyboka)
- Company: Public Stock Society Zasyadko Mine
- Acquired: 1992

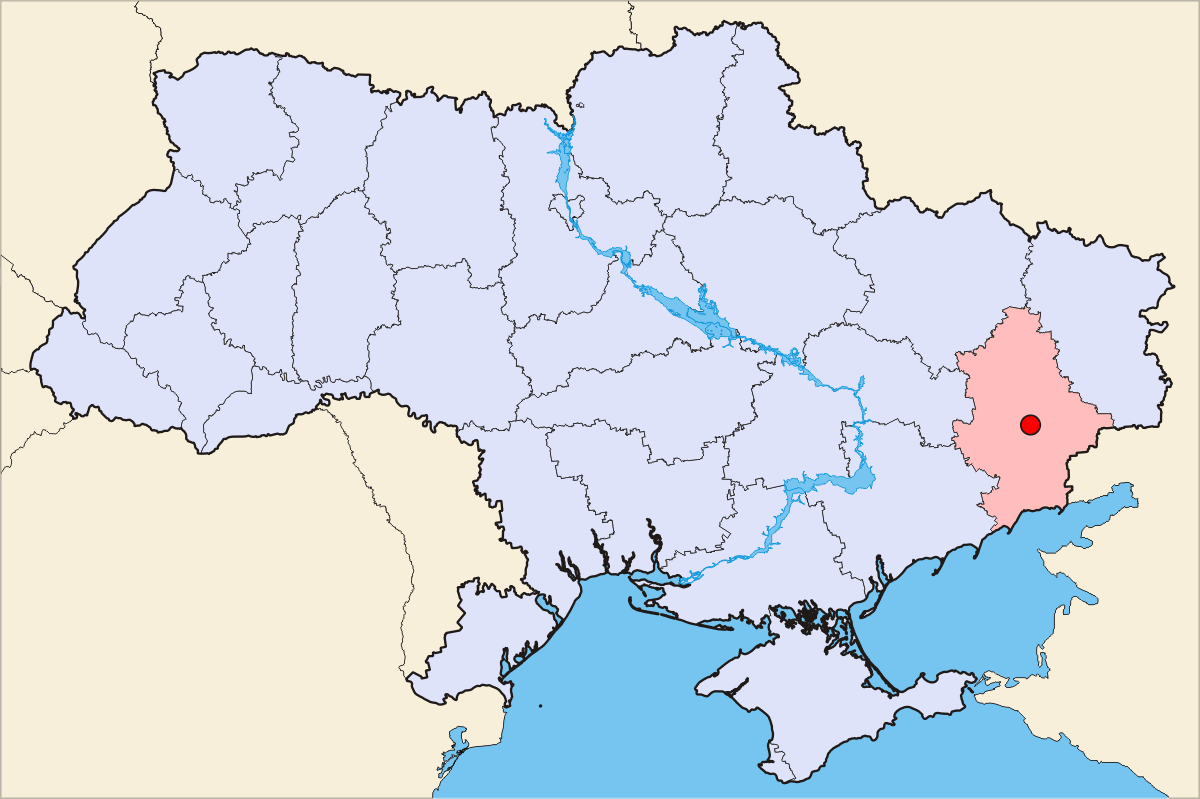
Location of Donetsk (red) and Donetsk Oblast (pink) on the map of Ukraine.

Zasyadko Mine (Ukrainian: Шахта ім. Засядька, Russian: Шахта им. А. Ф. Засядько) is a coal mining company in Ukraine's eastern city of Donetsk. Following the start of the War in Donbas in 2014 the mine became situated in territory controlled by the Donetsk People's Republic.

The manager and alleged owner of the company was Yukhym Zvyahilsky, influential businessman and politician within the Party of Regions. Along with its economic, technological and political importance, the company, namely its coal mine, is infamous for being the site of repeated mining accidents with numerous fatalities. The deadliest disaster, the worst in Ukraine’s history, happened on November 18, 2007, killing 101 miners.

== History ==
Production at the mine began in 1958, Since foundation, the mine is named after Alexander Zasyadko, one of the Soviet Ministers of Coal Industry.

In 1992, Zasyadko Mine was turned into a "rented enterprise" (practically privatised by the employees) together with several auxiliary industries. Yukhym Zvyahilsky, the then-manager of the mine and influential local businessman, retained his post and gained informal control of the new company's assets. Mr. Zvyahilsky has been the acting Prime Minister of Ukraine for a short time in early 1990s and a member of the Verkhovna Rada (parliament) of all convocations. He is known as an influential member of the Party of Regions.

== Mining dangers ==
The Zasyadko Mine is one of the most dangerous coal mines in the world due to naturally high levels of gas (particularly methane) and coal dust explosion hazards. Additionally, gradual exhaustion made the mine as large as having 6 shafts and, most importantly, very deep. As of 2004, depths of excavation varied from 529m to 1270m.

However, an independent mining expert recently claimed that the company is interfering with its hazard-measuring equipment on a regular basis, in order to present underground situation as being within the safety standards, and so to prevent closure by the government inspectors. President Yushchenko blamed the cabinet for failing to “implement safe-mining practices” in the coal industry.

== Accidents ==
The Zasyadko Mine has had seven serious mining accidents:

- May 24, 1999 – 50 workers killed, 40 injured.
- August 19, 2001 – 55 workers killed, 34 injured.
- July 31, 2002 – 20 workers killed, two injured.
- September 20, 2006 – 13 workers killed, 61 injured.
- November 18, 2007 – 101 workers killed, dozens injured (2007 Zasyadko mine disaster).
- December 1, 2007 – 52 workers injured.
- December 2, 2007 – five workers killed, 30 injured.
- March 4, 2015 - seventeen workers killed, 15 missing. (2015 Zasyadko mine disaster).
- June 18, 2022 - 77 miners trapped due to shelling. All later rescued with no injuries.

== See also ==
- Coal in Ukraine
- List of mines in Ukraine
