= Nitrofert =

Company based in Estonia

Nitrofert AS
- Company type: Subsidiary of Ostchem Holding
- Industry: Chemical industry
- Headquarters: Kohtla-Järve, Estonia
- Key people: Aleksei Nikolajev (CEO)
- Products: Fertilizers
- Number of employees: 48
- Parent: Ostchem Holding

Nitrofert AS is a manufacturer of fertilizers based in Kohtla-Järve, Estonia. It is a subsidiary of Ostchem Holding, owned by Ukrainian oligarch Dmytro Firtash.

== History ==
History of Nitrofert reaches back to 1968 when Kohtla-Järve Oil Shale Processing Association named after V.I. Lenin (Slantsekhim) built a nitrogen fertilizers' plant. Production of synthetic urea started in 1969 and ammonia in 1979.

In 1993, Slantsekhim was reorganized and the fertilizers' plant was renamed RAS Kiviter Kohtla-Järve Lämmastikväetise Tootmine. At the same year, the plant was separated into a separate company Nitrofert AS and was privatized to Lentransgaz, a subsidiary of Gazprom, as a payment for the gas debt. In 1996, Lentransgaz divested 50% shares to ZAO Gaz-Oil and 45% of shares to ZAO IFK Faktor—both companies affiliated to the management of Gazprom. 5% of shares were transferred to the Pühtitsa Convent of the Moscow Patriarchate. In 1999, IFK Faktor transferred its shares to J.I.T. Press S.A., a company registered in Luxembourg. In February 2000, the Pühtitsa Convent sold its shares to Batball OÜ. In November 2001, Gaz-Oil and J.I.T. Press transferred their stakes to an offshore company Oriental Chemtrade Ltd. which was registered in the British Virgin Islands. Oriental Chemtrade was interested to purchase also shares belonging to Batball; however, they succeeded only in 2006. In 2006, Oriental Chemtrade was replaced with Balmat Holding Limited, affiliated with Dmytro Firtash and registered in Cyprus. Firtash also became a chairman of the board of Nitrofert. As a result of restructuring of the group of companies owned by Firtash, Ostchem Resources Ltd. became owner of Nitrofert in 2014.

In 1995, Nitrofert announced a plan to build a methanol plant. For this investment, a decision to expand the company's share capital was adopted in 2000. New shares forming a majority of the share capital were issued to the Greece-based Virginia Equities Group. However, Virginia did not fulfill its commitments and these shares were annulled in 2001. Consequently, the methanol plant was not built.

In 2000, Nitrofert ceased its operations for two months due to economic difficulties and accumulated debts. The long time CEO of Nitrofert, Nikolai Kutašov was fired and Aleksei Nikolajev was appointed as new CEO in March 2001. In summer 2001, the plant was closed for two months because of the maintenance works. In November 2002, Nitrofert ceased its operations again. It resumed its operations in July 2003.

In 2007, Nitrofert on behalf of Chemtrade participated in the privatization of the Odesa Portside Plant, the second-largest fertilizer producer in Ukraine, but the privatization was suspended.

In February 2009, Nitrofert again stopped working due to fertilizers' low prices at the global market. It resume production at the end of 2012; however, the plant was closed for maintenance works in August 2013. After several unsuccessful attempts to resume production, the company started to lay off its employees in 2015. In January 2020, the company announced that it may permanently close production in Estonia and transfer production equipment to other Ostchem's plants in Ukraine.

== Operations ==
Nitrofert has capacity to produce 100,000 tons of liquid ammonia and 180,000 tons of urea annually. In 2008, it used 210 million cubic metres (7.4×10^{9} cu ft) of natural gas which accounted around a quarter of Estonia's annual gas consumption. It consumed around 3–5% of electricity generated in Estonia.

In 1998, Nitrofert had around 600 employees and in 2013 the company employed 462 employees. As of January 2020, the company had only 48 employees.
