= Stirol =

Stirol Konzern
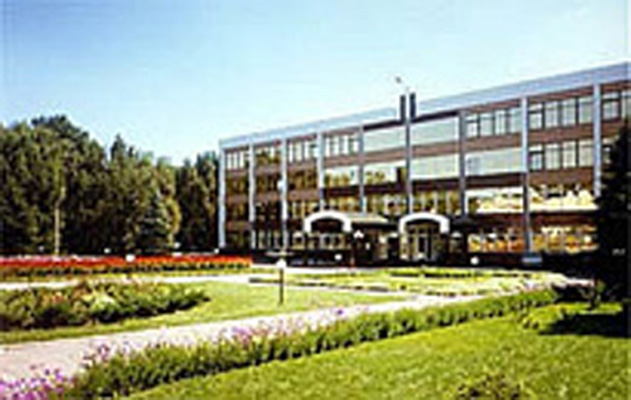
- Stirol Plant Management
- Type: Konzern
- Industry: Chemical industry
- Founded: 1933
- Founder: Council of Ministers (Ukrainian SSR)
- Headquarters: Horlivka, Ukraine
- Products: Nitrogen Fertilizers
- Parent: Ostchem Holding
- Website: http://stirol.ostchem.com/en/about-us

Stirol is a currently closed down plant and one of the oldest manufacturers of nitrogen fertilizers in Ukraine. It is part of bigger chemical holding Ostchem Holding which unites several other chemical plants in Ukraine and some former Soviet republics that specialize in manufacturing of fertilizers.

The plant was built in 1933 and became the first manufacturer in the Soviet Union that obtained ammonia from a coke gas. "Stirol" means styrene. "Stirol" is located in Horlivka and used to employ 4,500 people. The plant became situated in the separatist Donetsk People's Republic during the War in Donbas. Separatist authorities have not been able to keep the plant open.

== History ==
=== In the Soviet Union and Ukraine ===
The plant was founded in 1933 in the Soviet Union as the Horlivka Nitrogen Fertilizer Factory, making it one of the first producers of ammonia in the country. During World War Two, Sitorl was evacuated into the Ural Region. Throughout its time in the Soviet Union, the complex of the factory expanded, and by the era of the 1970s to 1980s it had reached a peak production capacity. It comprised 12 factories and 30 structures; by this point, it employed around 4,000 employees. The plant was important because it was close to the Tolyatti-Horlivika-Odesa pipeline, where its products were products were exported to. In September 1988, Mykola Yankovsky became the general director of the factory. Following the collapse of the Soviet Union, Yankovsky helped privatise the plant with foreign investment. Yankovsky continued to hold the plant alongside his son Ihor throughout the 2000s via an offshore company that was registered in the United Kingdom and Hungary. It was later estimated that the Yankovsky family had extracted more than $1.1 billion from the enterprise during the time he owned it.

In September 2010, however, Stirol was acquired by Ostchem Holding, which is a subsidiary of Group DF under Dmytro Firtash. This was the fourth nitrogen fertilizer company that the company had acquired, as it held one in Ukraine, one in Tajikistan, and one in Estonia. The stake they acquired was 90.3% of the company. Ostchem said they had acquired the company to improve the competitiveness for nitrogen fertilizers in the region due to the growth of Asian and Middle Eastern producers in comparison.

=== 2013 ammonia leak ===
On 6 August 2013, an ammonia pipeline at the plant ruptured during maintenance at the factory, creating a toxic cloud that caused severe chemical burns to employees. Of the workers at the factory, five were killed, and 22 were hospitalized with burns. Representatives later said that the accident was due to the pipeline being worn and machinery pipelines that had never been addressed by the plant and were never modernised. The plant had long had accidents every year, but most were without fatalities until 2013. Afterwards, Firtash, the Minister of Social Policy, Natalia Korolevska, and a representative from the plant agreed to compensate the families of those killed, with each family receiving one million hryvnias. The plant also assumed responsibility for taxes, medical costs, and educational support for children.

=== Closure and occupation by the DPR ===
In May 2014, following the outbreak of the War in the Donbas, the plant suspended all of its production of ammonia and fully cleared out its facilities due to safety reasons as it was near the front lines. During this time, it was noted that the forced shutdown in May without any precautions that an ordinary decommissioning would require had left reactor installations, high-pressure pipelines, and cooling systems without maintenance, which could be dangerous. The company at the time said all employees would still receive a salary despite it being shut down. Soon afterwards, Horlivka was captured by the self-declared, pro-Russian Donetsk People's Republic. Over the year, the DNR said that the plant would restart partially, but no full restart happened. In March 2017, it was confirmed the plant would not be nationalised by the DNR, because of support for the owner Firtash in Russia, as he had supported the country following the outbreak of the war. Workers were also told that they could still continue to receive salaries in hryvnias and would be able to travel to Ukrainian-controlled territory, but that they would be required to join DNR civic organisations.

In November 2021, the plant did resume some ammonia operations. However, following the Russian invasion of Ukraine, this again stopped because the DPR claimed that Ukrainian forces were shelling the factory. In August 2023, infrastructure at the plant was claimed to be destroyed by an artillery strike, according to the then-mayor of Horlivka. It was also reported on Telegram during this time that parts of the complex were being dismantled for scrap metal.

In March 2024, Denis Pushilin claimed at an investment forum in Russia that investors had been found in order to revive the plant, and he also said, despite earlier reports, the infrastructure of the facility was largely intact. He did not say who the investors were or any concrete plans. By this point, the plant was now in the territory of Russia following the highly controversial Russian annexation of Donetsk, Kherson, Luhansk and Zaporizhzhia oblasts. However, as of 2025, the plant still continues to remain non-operational, and it has not seen any maintenance since its closure in 2014. Analysts have said that the aging infrastructure is a potential hazard, as even if it is shut down, regular inspection is needed to take place.
