= 2015 Zasyadko mine disaster =

Deadly coal mine explosion in Donetsk Oblast, Ukraine

Coordinates: 48.0523°N 37.7897°E

- Location of Donetsk Oblast in Ukraine
- Date: 4 March 2015
- Location: Donetsk Oblast, Ukraine
- Deaths: 34
- Injuries: 14

On 4 March 2015, at around 05:20 local time, there was a mining accident at the Zasyadko coal mine in rebel-held Eastern Ukraine. It is suspected to have been caused by a gas explosion.

Twenty-three people were confirmed dead. Local rebels claimed a death toll of 30. There were 230 people in the mine at the time of the explosion. The Speaker of the Ukrainian parliament, Volodymyr Groysman, called for a minute's silence for 32 fatalities, but later retracted that figure to say that one had died and 30 others' status was unknown.

Ukrainian President Petro Poroshenko called for police and rescue services to have access to the mine.

== See also ==
- 2007 Zasyadko mine disaster
