= Group DF =

Ukrainian chemical, titanium, gas, and banking group

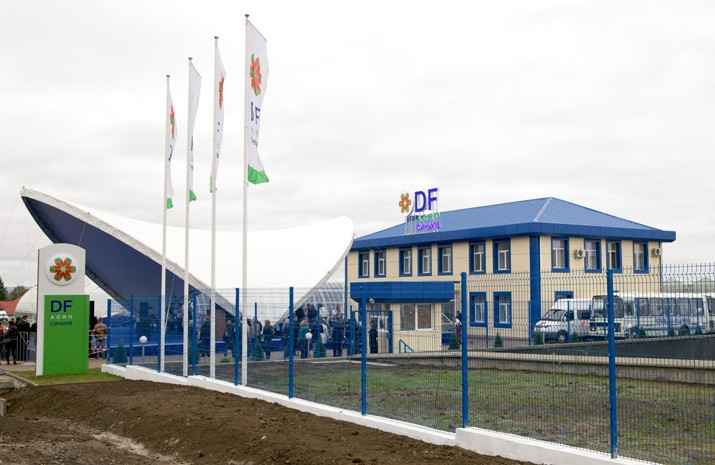
- Company type: Business
- Founded: 2007
- Founder: Dmytro Firtash
- Headquarters: Kyiv, Ukraine
- Key people: Dmytro Firtash (owner, founder); Borys Krasnyansky (managing director); Oleh Arestarkhov (Head of Corporate Communications)
- Products: Agribusiness; Banking; Energy; Gas; Media; Nitrogen; Real estate; Sodium carbonate; Titanium
- Owner: Dmytro Firtash
- Number of employees: 100

Group DF is a Ukrainian conglomerate with holdings in various sectors, including chemicals, titanium production, gas, and banking. Group DF also holds investments in agriculture, media, sodium carbonate production, energy infrastructure, and real estate. Group DF operates across 11 countries in the Eurasian region.

Businessman Dmytro Firtash founded Group DF in 2007. The managing director is Boris Krasnyansky. According to Boris Krasnyansky at the "Ukraine – Inside View" conference (organized by The Economist) that was held in Vienna, Austria in March 2013, Group DF's consolidated revenue in 2012 amounted to more than 6 billion USD.

Group DF plans to continue expanding and consolidating assets across its business sectors, including fertilizer, titanium, gas distribution, and agriculture.

== History ==
=== 1988–1992 ===
Dmytro Firtash launched his business career in commodity trading across Ukraine and Russia.

=== 1993–2001 ===
Dmytro Firtash established trade relationships in Central Asia, exchanging consumer goods for natural gas.

=== 2002 ===
Eural Trans Gas Kft secured rights to transport Turkmen natural gas to Ukraine.

=== 2003 ===
Dmytro Firtash established EMFESZ Kft.

=== 2004 ===
Dmytro Firtash co-founded RosUkrEnergo AG with Gazprom (Russia). He became a shareholder in Crimea TITAN and acquired a majority stake in the Crimean Soda Plant. He also founded OSTCHEM.

=== 2005–2008 ===
RosUkrEnergo AG supplied natural gas from Central Asia to Ukraine and other European countries. EMFESZ Kft secured a license to supply natural gas to Poland.

Crimea TITAN's Irshansk Mining and Concentration Complex launched three new ilmenite production sites.

Dmytro Firtash founded Group DF. The Group entered the real estate sector.

Crimea TITAN began constructing a new sulfuric acid plant. Crimean Soda Plant produced 764,000 tonnes of soda ash.

=== 2009 ===
The Crimean Soda Plant installed a steam turbine, generating 20% of its energy needs.

=== 2010 ===
Group DF launched a transformation program with Price Waterhouse Coopers (PwC). OSTCHEM acquired a majority stake in Concern Stirol. Crimea TITAN produced a record 105,000 tonnes of titanium dioxide.

=== 2011 ===
Group DF International was founded as the group's corporate hub. Group DF acquired a controlling stake in Nadra Bank. OSTCHEM acquired controlling stakes in several Ukrainian nitrogen fertilizer producers (Cherkaskyi Azot, Severodonetsk Azot Association, and Rivneazot), alongside Concern Stirol. OSTCHEM also acquired a controlling stake in the Nika Tera Specialized Seaport in Mykolayiv.

=== 2012 ===
Group DF launched its agribusiness project, Synkiv Agro, a greenhouse complex in Synkiv, Ternopil Oblast. It acquired a controlling stake in UkrAgro NPK, a Ukrainian mineral fertilizer distributor. Crimea TITAN completed a new sulfuric acid plant (600,000 tonnes annual capacity), increasing titanium dioxide production capacity to 120,000 tonnes annually. In December, Group DF acquired 100% of Crimea TITAN's shares.

=== 2013 ===
Group DF entered the media industry, acquiring a controlling stake in Inter Media Group (owner of television channels including INTER). Group DF also invested in Zaporizhzhya Titanium and Magnesium Combine, Europe's only producer of titanium sponge.

=== 2014 ===
Group DF expanded the UkrAgro NPK regional distribution network, increasing the number of warehouses from 15 to 28 to improve fertilizer delivery. The Crimean Soda Plant then began producing baking soda, becoming the only producer in Ukraine. Group DF also supported the World Economic Forum in Davos "Scenarios for the Development of Ukraine" and the Days of Ukraine in the United Kingdom.

=== 2021 ===
Firtash sold Crimea Titan to a Russian company due to complications arising from the Russian invasion of Crimea.

== See also ==
- Ostchem Holding
- Sievierodonetsk Association Azot
- Azot (Cherkasy)
