= 2008 Ukraine coal mine collapse =

Explosion and collapse of a coal mine in Donetsk Oblast

Coordinates: 48.216°N 38.2°E

- Location: Yenakiieve, Donetsk Oblast, Ukraine
- Type: Mine disaster

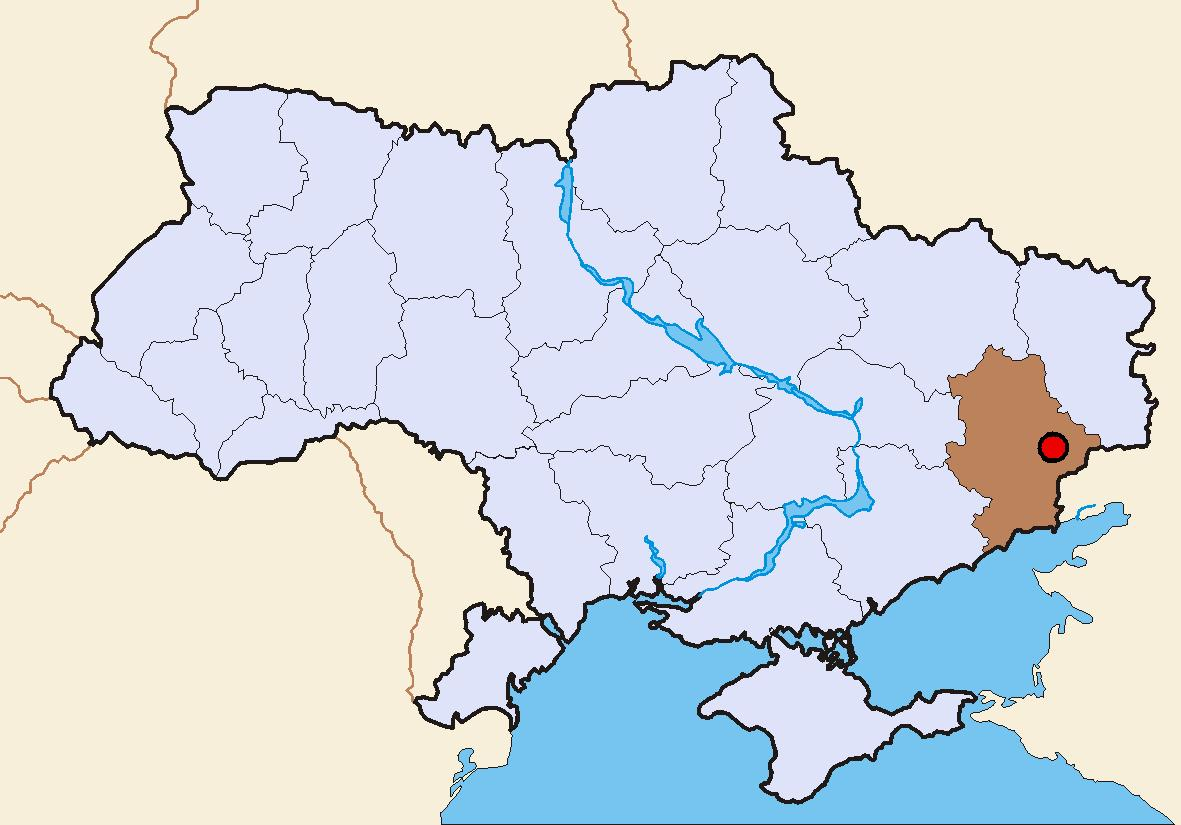
The Karl Marx coal mine's location in highlighted region

The 2008 Ukrainian coal mine collapse occurred at the Karl Marx Coal Mine in the city of Yenakiieve, Donetsk Oblast (province) of eastern Ukraine on June 8, 2008.

== History ==
The mine collapse was said to have been caused by a gas pipe explosion. The explosion occurred at a depth of about 1,750 feet (533 m). Thirty-seven miners were trapped underground at the time of the collapse, located 3,301 feet (1,006 m) below the surface of the earth. Additionally, five surface workers suffered from burns and other injuries in a blast that they described as one of the most powerful in the industry.

The workers in the mine were supposed to have been checking for safety concerns in the mine and fixing them, not mining, as the Karl Marx Coal Mine was one of 23 coal mines in the country closed for safety violations. However, a spokeswoman for the safety agency said that audio tapes prove that the miners were extracting coal that day, thus violating the ban. An investigation commission plans to have the management of the mine charged with negligence.

Rescue crews were sent down ventilation shafts, as the main shafts were blocked because of the explosion, and two miners were rescued at some time after the collapse. One body was found in the rubble. On June 9, it was announced that 22 more miners, who had been waiting for 30 hours, were rescued by the crews, while 13 remained buried. On June 10, an official said that there was little chance that the 12 remaining miners were alive, as 9 of them were riding up an elevator when the blast happened, sending the cage down the shaft, and the other three were 1,000 metres (3,281 ft) underground, where methane levels were dangerously high after the explosion. Officials were also concerned that the mine could flood. More than 30 metres (98 ft) have flooded into the mine, a report says. Little hope was expressed by officials for the twelve miners still trapped.

The Ukrainian president Viktor Yushchenko criticized the gas explosion and mine collapse as a failing of the government's policies and the outdatedness of the mines in the country.

== See also ==
- 2007 Zasyadko mine disaster, a methane explosion in November 2007
- 2013 Chemical accident in Horlivka
