= Sievierodonetsk =

City in Luhansk Oblast, Ukraine

Sievierodonetsk Сєвєродонецьк (Ukrainian) Северодонецк (Russian) Severodonetsk
- City
- Siverskodonetsk
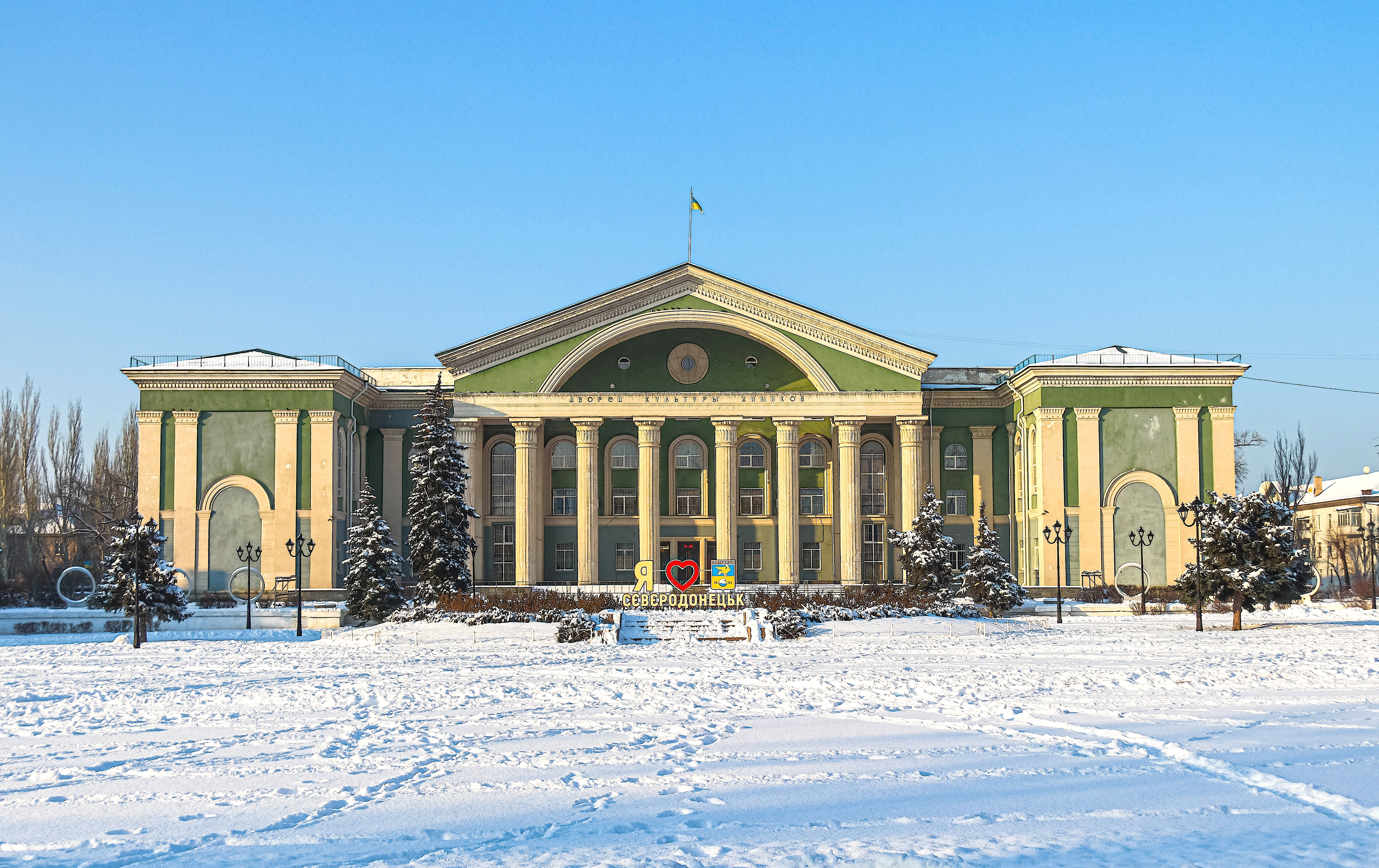
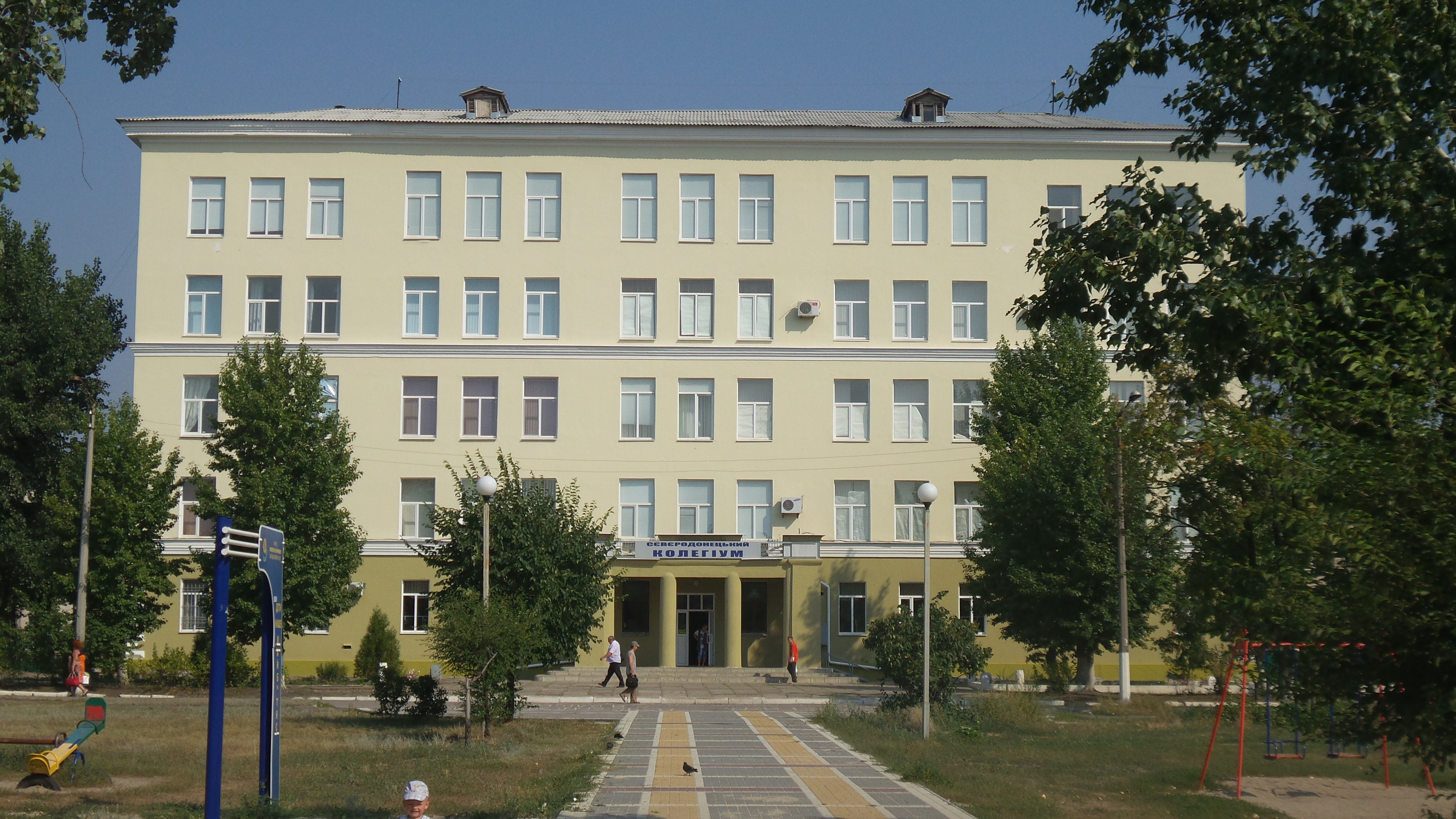
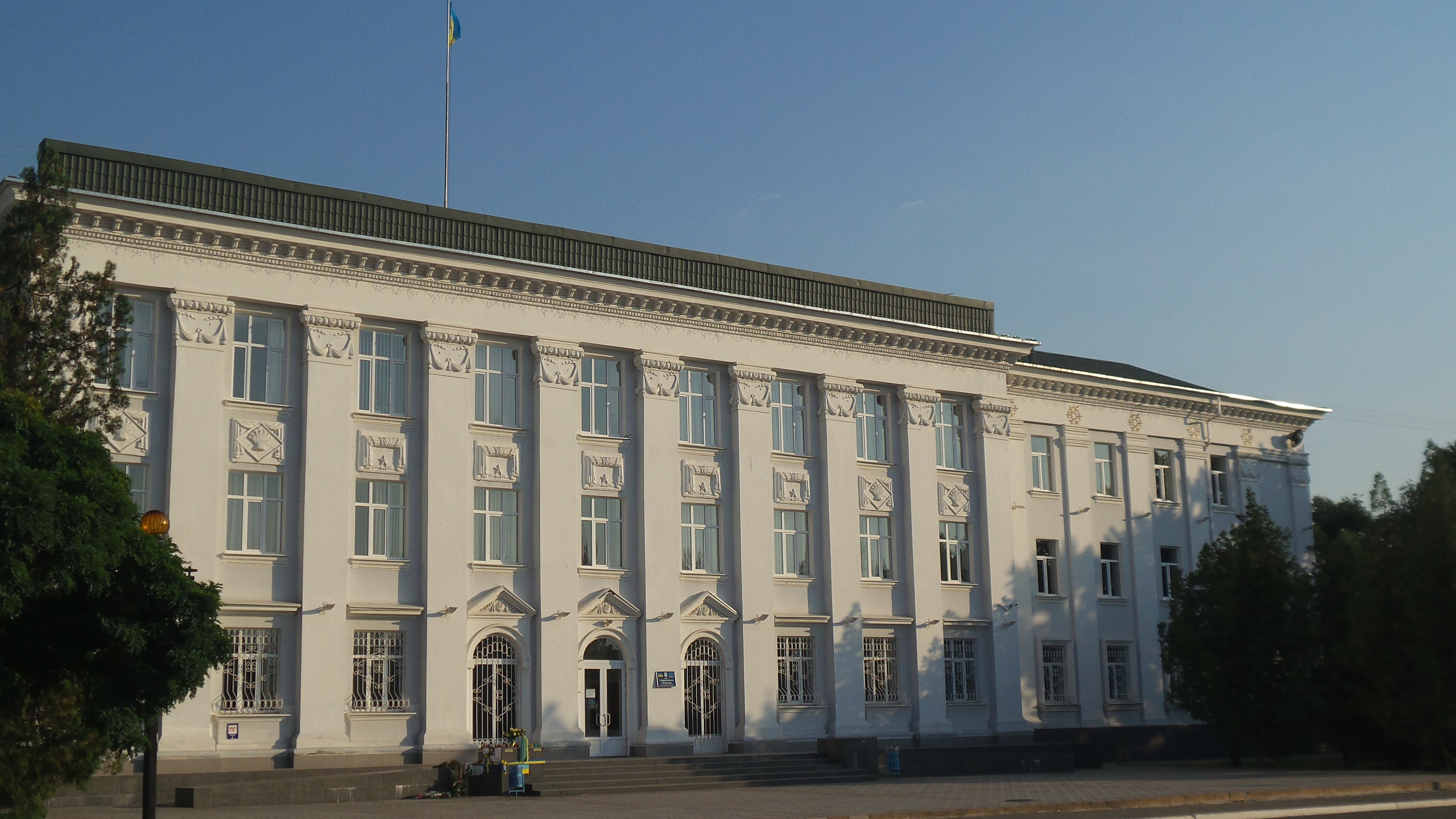
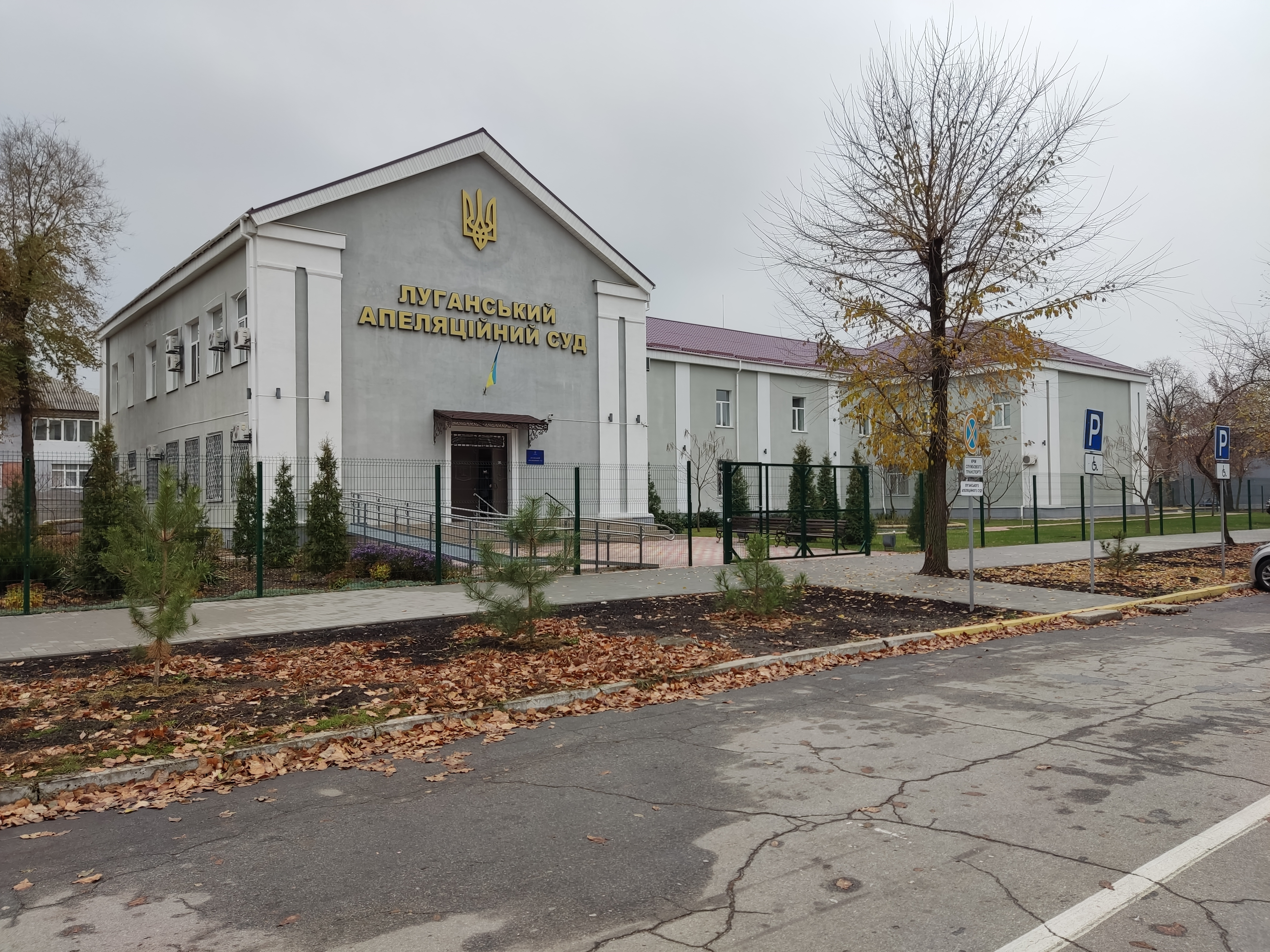
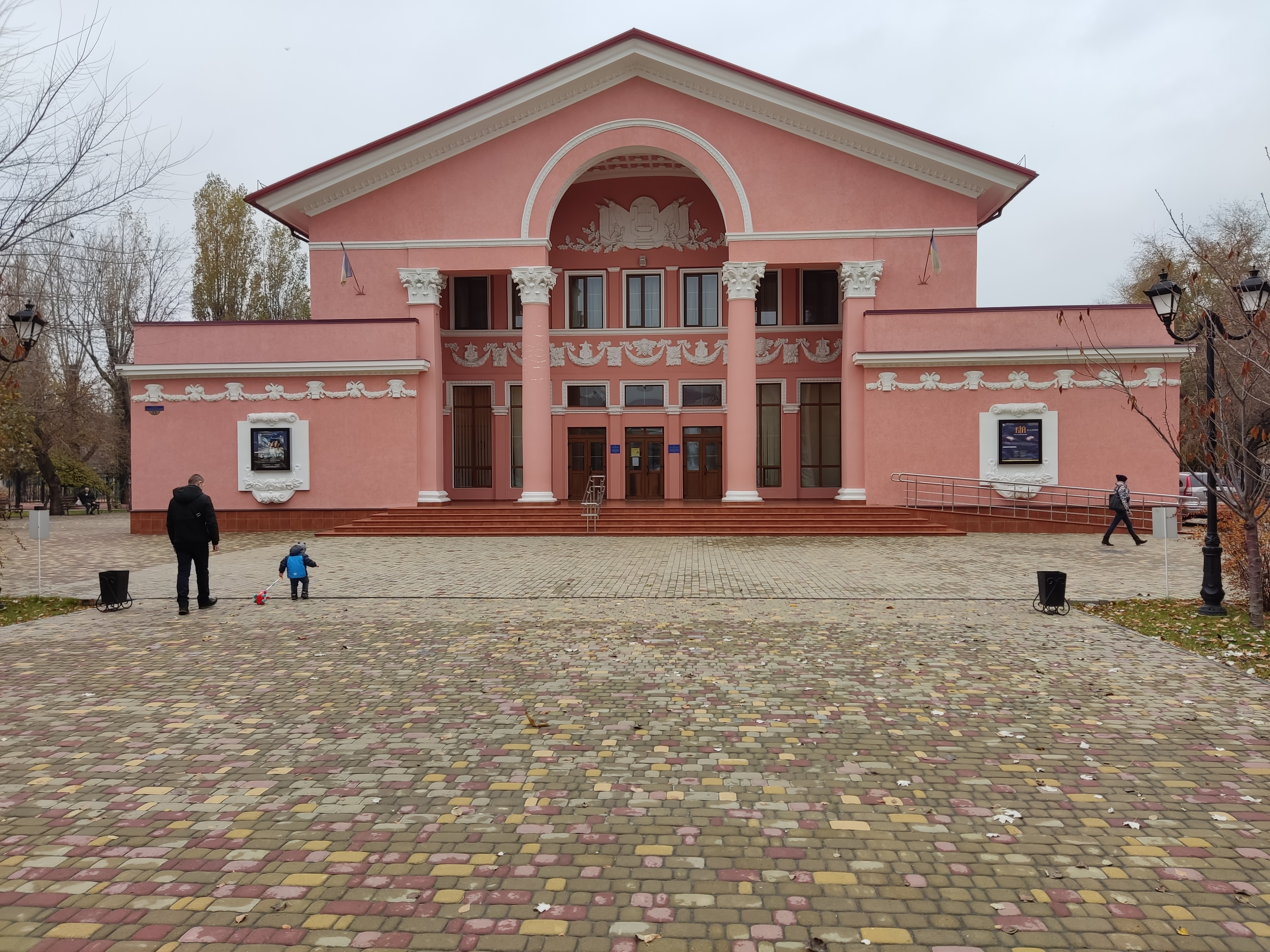
- Palace of Culture of Chemists Sievierodonetsk Collegium City Hall Court of Appeals Municipal Theatre

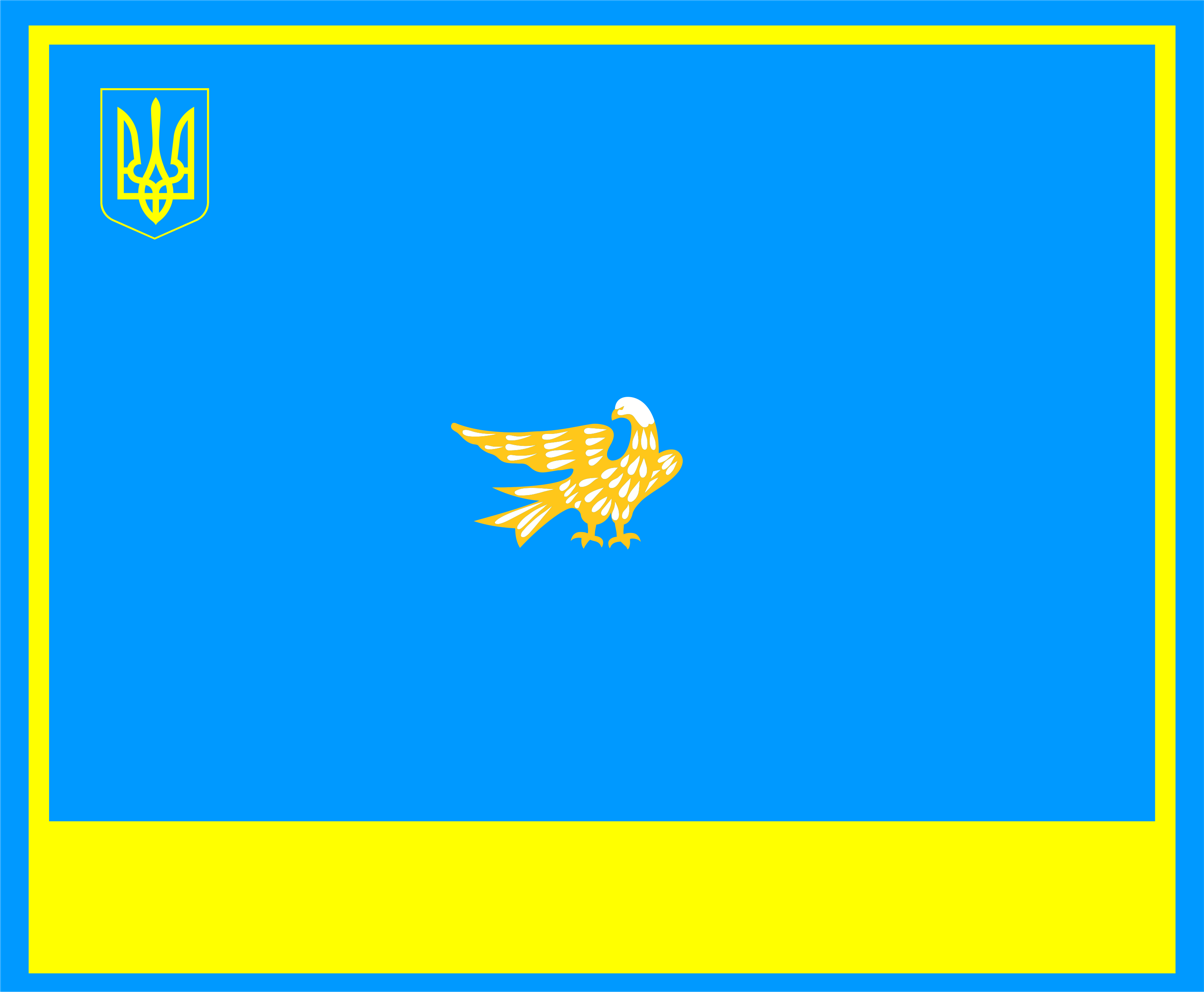
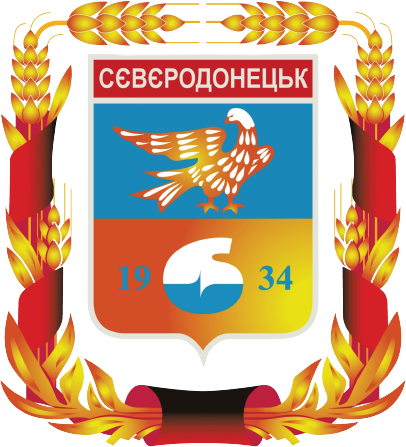
- Flag Coat of arms
- Interactive map of Sievierodonetsk
- Location of Sievierodonetsk Sievierodonetsk (Ukraine)
- Coordinates: 48°56′53″N 38°29′36″E
- Country: Ukraine
- Oblast: Luhansk Oblast
- Raion: Sievierodonetsk Raion
- Hromada: Sievierodonetsk urban hromada
- Founded: 29 April 1934
- City status: 1958

Government
  - Head of Military-Civil Administration: Oleksandr Stryuk

Area
  - Total: 42.1 km^{2} (16.3 sq mi)
- Elevation: 51 m (167 ft)

Population
  - Estimate (2024): ~40,000
- Time zone: UTC+2 (EET)
  - Summer (DST): UTC+3 (EEST)
- Postal code: 93400
- Area code: +380 6452 (645)
- Vehicle registration: BB, HB
- Climate: Dfb
- Website: sed-rada.gov.ua

Sievierodonetsk (Note: UK: /ˌsɛvərədɒnˈjɛtsk/ SEV-ər-ə-don-YETSK; Ukrainian: Сєвєродонецьк, IPA: [ˌsʲɛwʲerodoˈnɛtsʲk].) or Severodonetsk, (Note: Russian: Северодонецк, IPA: [sʲɪvʲɪrədɐˈnʲetsk].) officially since 2024 Siverskodonetsk, (Note: Ukrainian: Сіверськодонецьк, IPA: [ˌs⁽ʲ⁾iwersʲkodoˈnɛtsʲk].) is a city in Luhansk Oblast, eastern Ukraine. It is located to the northeast of the left bank of the Donets river and approximately 110 km (68 mi) to the northwest from the administrative center of the oblast, Luhansk. Sievierodonetsk faces neighbouring Lysychansk across the river. The city, whose name comes from the above-mentioned river, had a population of 99,067 (2022 estimate), making it then the second-most populous city in the oblast. Since June 2022, it has been militarily occupied and administered by Russia.

Prior to the war, Sievierodonetsk had several factories as well as the Azot chemical plant. There was also an airport six kilometres (3.7 mi) to the south of the city.

Sievierodonetsk served as the administrative centre of Luhansk Oblast from 2014 to 2022, due to the city of Luhansk falling under the control of pro-Russian separatists at the start of the war in Donbas. During the Russian invasion of Ukraine, Sievierodonetsk came under heavy attack from Russian forces and was the forefront of the battle of Donbas, resulting in extensive destruction to the city, including residential areas. By 25 June 2022, the city was fully captured by Russian and separatist forces, with Ukrainian authorities claiming that the civilian population was approximately 10,000, or ten percent of its pre-war population.

== Toponymy ==
According to one of the versions, the city got its name from the Donets. Based on the Russian name of the river (Сѣверный Донецъ, m: Северский Донець), the name of the city in Russian is Severodonetsk (Северодонецк, IPA: [ˌsʲevʲɪrədɐˈnʲetsk]). According to another version, the name comes from the location of the city, which is situated to the north of the Donets bank.

The Ukrainian name of the city has a rather complicated history. The decree of the Presidium of the Supreme Soviet of the Ukrainian Soviet Socialist Republic dated 27 January 1950, "On the renaming of the urban-type settlement Lyskhimstroi of the Lysychansk Raion of the Voroshilovgrad Oblast" was issued in Russian, and the name of the city was indicated as Severodonetsk, which was later translated into Ukrainian as Sievierodonetsk (Сєвєродонецьк, IPA: [ˌsʲɛwʲerodoˈnɛtsʲk]). However, this spelling is not in line with the Ukrainian language standards, and despite the correction attempts by numerous sources (such as dictionaries, maps, and official documents), the spelling was not fixed at the official level until 2024. At the same time, the name Sieverodonetsk (Сєверодонецьк, IPA: [ˌsʲɛwerodoˈnɛtsʲk]) was used in the decree on the assignment of the settlement to the category of cities of district significance.

According to the spelling of 1993 (in Section 108), the name of the city is Siverskodonetsk, which corresponds to the etymology (from the Siverskyi Donets). This name was included in the encyclopedias and reference books of the Soviet period. A number of Ukrainian linguists also stand on the same principles. Some Ukrainian publications have also used the name Siverodonetsk (Сіверодонецьк, IPA: [ˌs⁽ʲ⁾iwerodoˈnɛtsʲk]). Concurrently, the official name was Sieverodonetsk, which would be a proper spelling of the city from the Russian language, but did not conform with the standard Ukrainian language. In the Encyclopedia of Ukraine, the main name of the city is Siverskodonetske, while other spellings are Sieverodonetske and Pivnichnodonetske.

In the normative-legal document "Classification of objects of the administrative-territorial system of Ukraine", the city was classified as Siverodonetsk, and the aforesaid name was used in other official documents in recent years. Until mid-1990, the spelling Sieverodonetsk prevailed on the signs of institutions in the city itself, but Severodonetsk and Sievierodonetsk were also used.

In 2016, there was a proposal in the Verkhovna Rada to officially rename the city Siverskodonetsk, changing the Russian exonym to a Ukrainian version with the same meaning, but it was rejected by the committee.

On 3 April 2024, the Committee on the Organization of State Power, Local Self-government, Regional Development, and Urban Planning in the Verkhovna Rada stated their support for renaming the city to Siverskodonetsk (Сіверськодонецьк). The name was finally approved by the Verkhovna Rada on 19 September 2024.

== History ==
=== Foundation and the Soviet era ===
The foundation of modern Sievierodonetsk is closely connected with the beginning of construction of the Lysychansk Nitrogen Fertilizer Plant within the limits of Lysychansk, Donetsian Oblast, Ukrainian SSR, Soviet Union in 1934. Donets itself was already combined with Lysychansk. The first settlement of workers on the construction site was called Lyskhimstroi (Ukrainian: Лисхімстрой, Russian: Лисхимстрой), near Donets. In September 1935, the first school was opened in the settlement, a silicate brick plant started production, and the first three residential two-story houses were built. In 1940, there were 47 houses, a school, a club, a kindergarten, a nursery, and 10 buildings of a chemical combine in Lyskhimstroi.

During the Second World War, Lyskhimstroi and surrounding areas were occupied by German forces on 11 July 1942. On 1 February 1943 it was retaken by the 41st Guards Rifle Division and 110th Tank Brigade of the Red Army. Work to restore and expand the Lysychansk Nitrogen Fertilizer Plant began on 10 December 1943 and by 1946, the pre-war housing stock was completely restored, which amounted to 17,000 square meters. An airfield south of the Lyskhimstroi began operations in May 1948; it underwent major renovations during the early 1960s.

Four new names were proposed for the settlement in 1950: Svetlograd, Komsomolsk-on-Donets, Mendeleevsk and Severodonetsk. It was ultimately renamed the latter, after the Seversky Donets. Severodonetsk would receive the status of an urban settlement the same year. On 1 January 1951, the Lysychansk Nitrogen Fertilizer Plant would produce its first output of ammonium nitrate.

A local newspaper named The Communist Way (Ukrainian: Комуністичний шлях, Russian: Коммунистический путь), later renamed Severodonetsk News (Ukrainian: Сєвєродонецькі вісті, Russian: Северодонецкие вести), was published in the city from 2 April 1965 to early 2019.

=== Independent Ukraine ===
==== War in Donbas ====
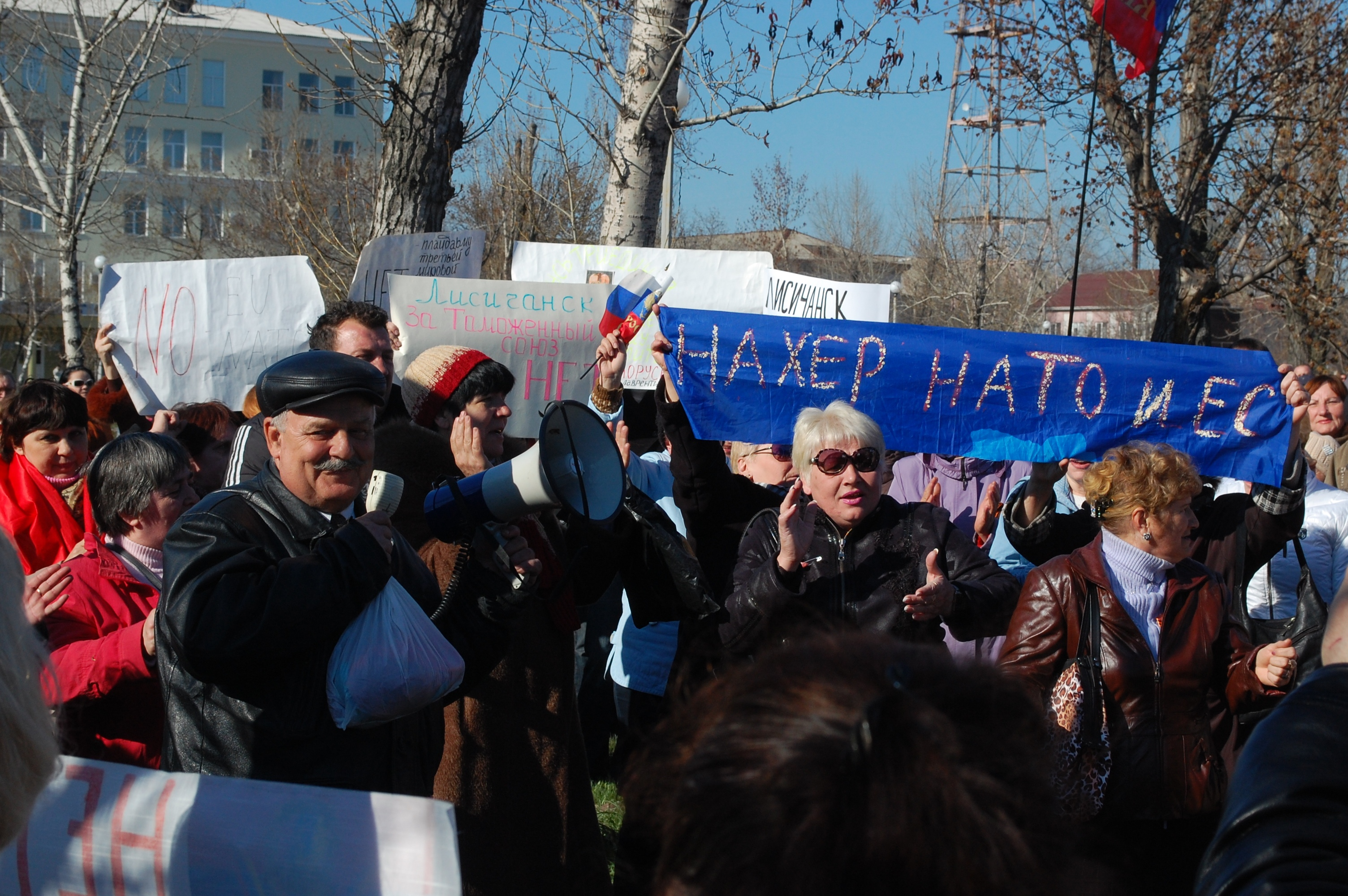
A pro-Russian demonstration in response to the recent change in power in Kyiv near the Sievierodonetsk city council building, 6 April 2014

In the war in Donbas, the city was captured in late May 2014 by combined pro-Russian forces, who totaled up to 1,000. The 2014 Ukrainian presidential election was not held in the city as the separatist authorities did not allow voting places to open and much of the Ukrainian Central Election Commission's property was either stolen or destroyed. On 22 July 2014, Ukrainian forces regained control of the city. Heavy fighting continued around the city for a number of days; on 23 July 2014 the National Guard of Ukraine and the Ukrainian Army released a statement that said they were "continuing the cleansing of Sievierodonetsk".

A bridge across Siverskyi Donets river was severely damaged during the war in 2014; it was re-opened in December 2016. The European Union contributed 93.8% of the funding for the bridge's restoration.

==== Russian invasion ====
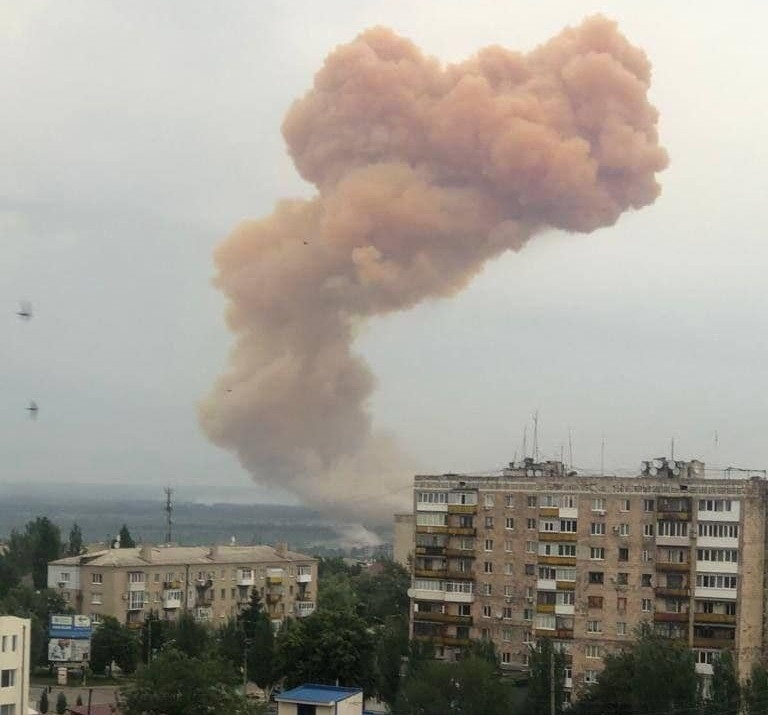
Smoke from shelling of the center of Sievierodonetsk by Russian forces, 30 May 2022

During the 2022 battle of Donbas in the Russian invasion of Ukraine, Sievierodonetsk became the center of intense fighting and media attention. In May, Russian forces made Sievierodonetsk its major focus in an attempt to capture Luhansk Oblast. On 31 May, the city's mayor stated that Russian forces had seized control of half of the city. By 14 June, Russian forces had control of 80% of the city and had cut off all escape routes. On 24 June, the Ukrainian government ordered its forces to withdraw from Sievierodonetsk.

On 26 June, Russian Defence Minister Spokesman Lieutenant General Igor Konashenkov stated the Luhansk People's Militia and Russian Armed Forces had "completely liberated the cities of Severodonetsk and Borovskoye as well as populated localities Voronovo and Sirotino in the Luhansk People's Republic".

In March 2023, the Ukrainian law "On the Condemnation and Prohibition of Propaganda of Russian Imperial Policy in Ukraine and the Decolonization of Toponymy" was passed, which provides for the derussification of Ukrainian toponymy. Among other elements, the law listed Sievierodonetsk as an example of "geographical features with Russified names" that would need to be either brought in line with Ukrainian spelling, or have a historical name returned. On 19 September 2024, the Verkhovna Rada voted to rename Sievierodonetsk to Siverskodonetsk.

== Demographics ==
Historical population
Year	Pop.	±%
1939	5,240	—
1959	33,180	+533.2%
1970	90,036	+171.4%
1979	113,041	+25.6%
1989	131,376	+16.2%
2001	119,940	−8.7%
2011	110,612	−7.8%
2022	99,067	−10.4%
2022 (June)	10,000	−89.9%
2024	40,000	+300.0%

As of the 2001 Ukrainian census, Sieverodonetsk had a population of 120,225 inhabitants. In terms of ethnic backgrounds, a solid majority of the population were ethnic Ukrainians, while people with a Russian background accounted for over one third of the population. The remainder of the population consists of smaller minority groups from the post-Soviet realm. Despite the ethnic Ukrainian majority in the city, most of the population speaks Russian as their first language, while only a large minority considers themselves native Ukrainian speakers. The exact ethnic and linguistic composition of the population was as follows:

Ethnic groups in Sieverodonetsk
	percent
Ukrainians	59.03%
Russians	38.67%
Belarusians	0.64%
Armenians	0.17%
Azerbaijanis	0.15%
Tatars	0.14%
Georgians	0.12%
Jews	0.10%
Moldovans	0.07%
Poles	0.05%
others	0.86%

Native languages in Sieverodonetsk
	percent
Russian	69.9%
Ukrainian	29.2%
Belarusian	0.1%
Armenian	0.1%
others	0.2%

== Economy ==
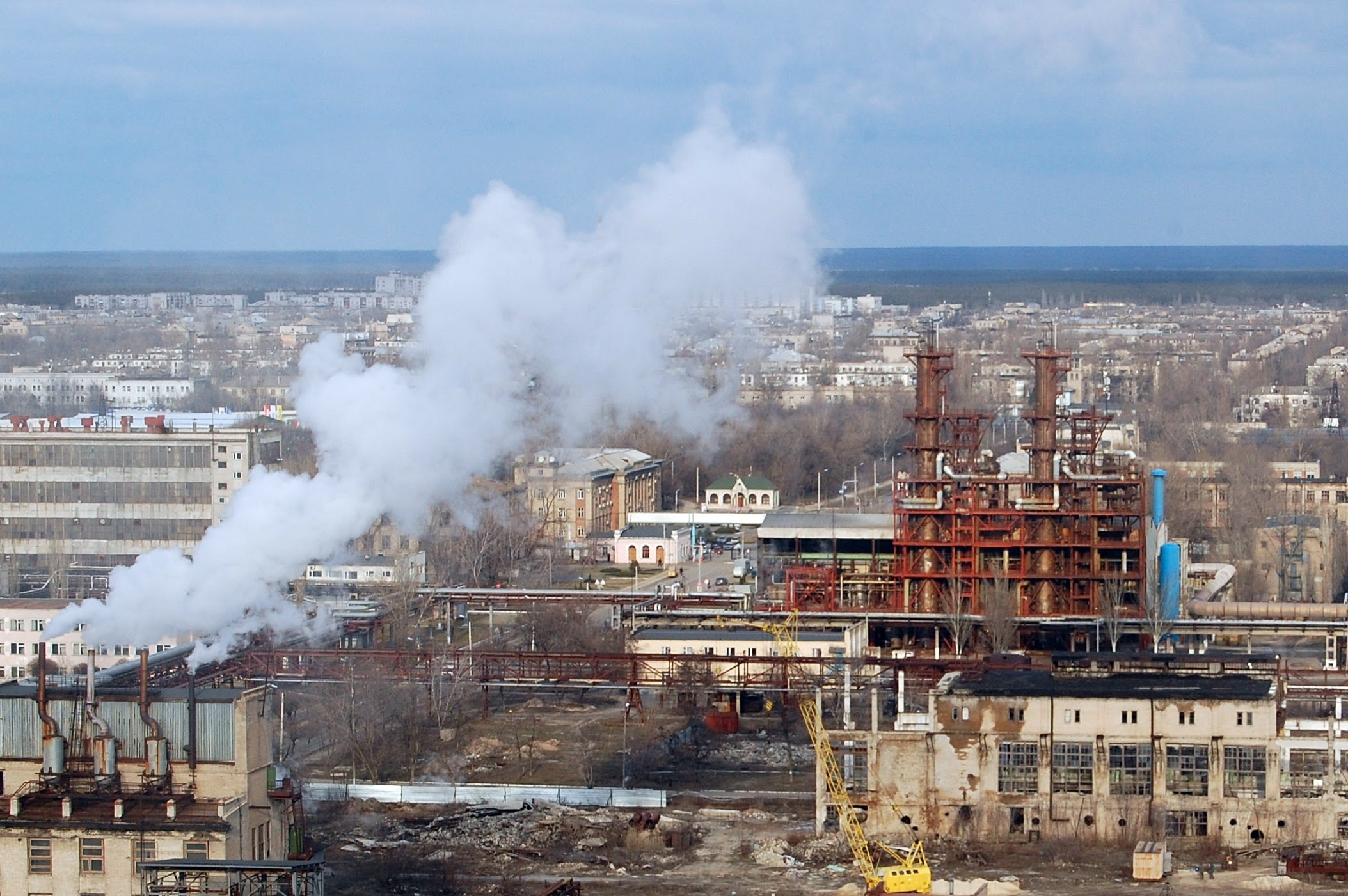
Azot Chemical Plant

Chemical industries formerly active in Sievierdonetsk include:

- "Azot" – one of the largest chemical plants in Europe.
- Khimpostavschik, a private enterprise
- Himexele

== Sports ==
The first Ukrainian championship in bandy was held in Sievierodonetsk in February 2012. Azot Severodonetsk, a bandy club based in the city, emerged victorious in the tournament.

== Twin towns – sister cities ==
Sievierodonetsk is twinned with the following municipalities:

- Jelenia Góra, Poland
- Rivne, Ukraine

== Notable people ==
Notable residents of Sievierodonetsk include:

- Irina Antanasijević (born 1965), Russo-Serbian philologist, literary critic, and translator
- Nikolay Davydenko (born 1981), retired professional tennis player
- Pavel Gubarev (born 1983), former commander of the Donetsk People's Militia and co-founder of the Angry Patriots Club
- Serhiy Haidai (born 1975), entrepreneur and former head of the Luhansk Regional Military–Civil Administration
- Yuriy Hritsyna (born 1971), professional football coach and former player
- Ruslan Kravchenko (born 1990), Ukrainian politician, who is currently serving as the Prosecutor General of Ukraine
- Yosip Kurlat (1927–2000), children's writer and translator
- Sergiy Lishchyna (born 1970), Ukrainian businessperson
- Snejana Onopka (born 1986), Ukrainian fashion model
- Valentin Pukhalsky (1887–1981), Soviet sculptor
- Borys Romanov (born 1949), graphic design artist
- Kurt Schmid (born 1942), Austrian conductor and composer
- Dmytro Semenenko (born 1988), Ukrainian powerlifter
- Svitlana Talan (born 1960), novelist
