= Aeroflot Flight N-63 =

1971 plane crash in Ukraine

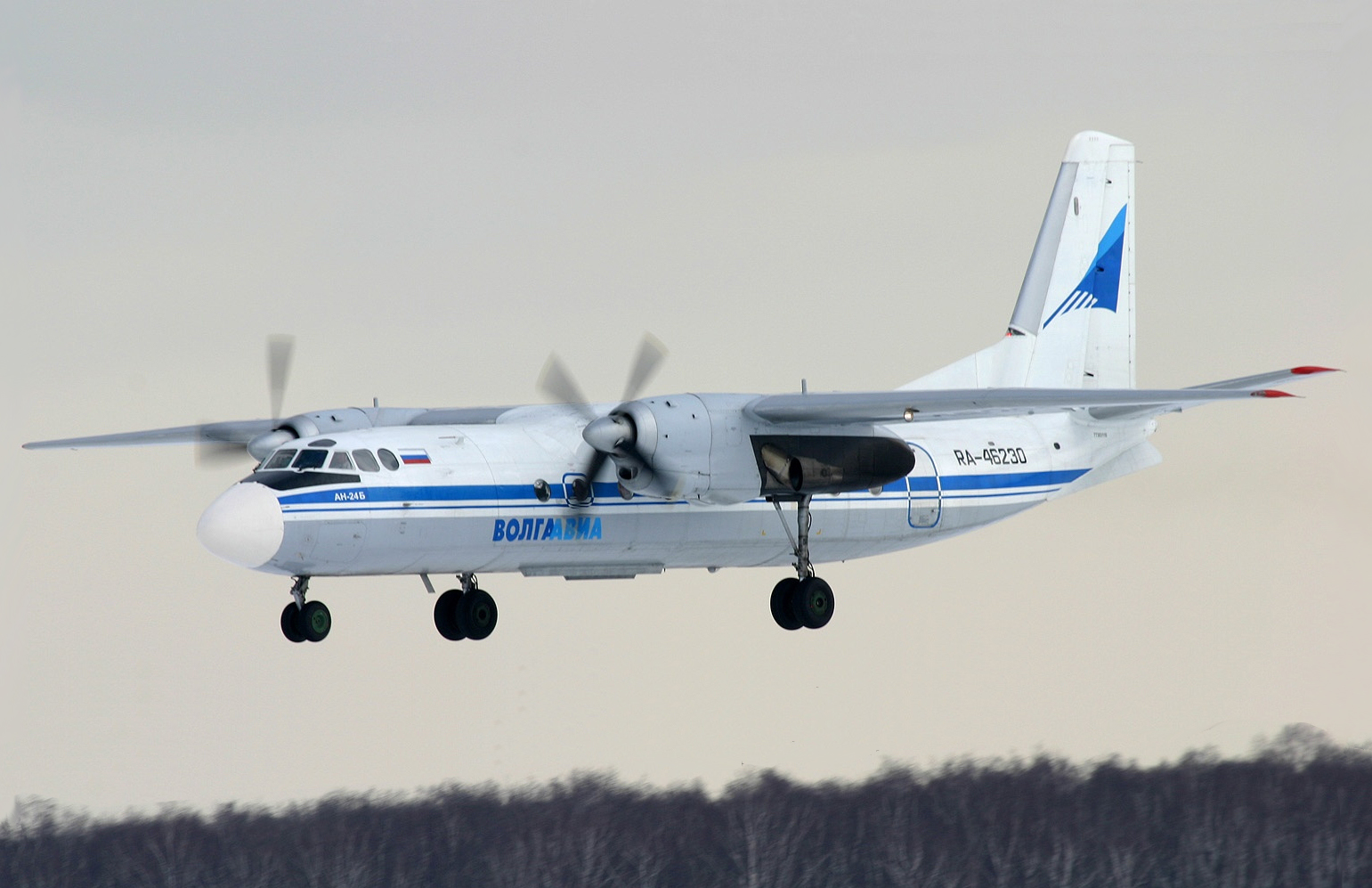
- An Antonov An-24 similar to the accident aircraft

Accident
- Date: 12 November 1971
- Summary: Stall, loss of control for reasons unknown
- Site: Near Vinnitsa Airport

Aircraft
- Aircraft type: Antonov An-24B
- Operator: Aeroflot/Ukraine
- Registration: CCCP-46809
- Flight origin: Kiev-Zhulyany Airport
- Destination: Vinnitsa Airport
- Passengers: 43
- Crew: 5
- Fatalities: 48
- Survivors: 0

Aeroflot Flight N-63 was a flight which crashed killing 48 people in Ukraine (then in the Soviet Union) in 1971.

== Aircraft ==
The Antonov An-24B involved in the accident was serial number 67302306 and registered as CCCP-46809 and operated by Aeroflot. The aircraft was manufactured on 26 February 1966 and assigned to the Ukrainian State Aviation Administration. The aircraft had been operating for 10,658 flight cycles and had a total of 11,329 flight hours.

== Accident ==
It was a scheduled Antonov An-24 flight on 12 November 1971 from Kiev-Zhulhyany Airport in Ukraine to Vinnitsa Airport in Ukraine. The flight proceeded routinely through takeoff and cruise, but started to enter trouble when on final approach due to the bad weather; this included freezing rain with fog and low clouds. The first landing attempt was aborted. The pilots attempted a second approach but could not land and initiated a go-around. During the go-around, the aircraft went nose-high and stalled before crashing 850 m (2,790 ft) short of the threshold. All 48 passengers and crew on board were killed.

== Investigation ==
Investigators concluded that the aircraft stalled during a low-altitude go-around. Two contributing scenarios were examined: a 3-5 second delay in applying full power, which could have allowed the airspeed to fall below a safe marigin, and a possible overestimation of the aerodynamic correction to indicated airspeed. Contributing factors to the accident were determined to have been poor weather, turbulence, the lack of stall-warning cues on the An-24, and a late go-around instruction from the controller.
