= Azot (Sievierodonetsk) =

Chemical plant in Sievierodonetsk, Ukraine

Coordinates: 48.9416°N 38.4733°E

Sievierodonetsk Association "Azot"
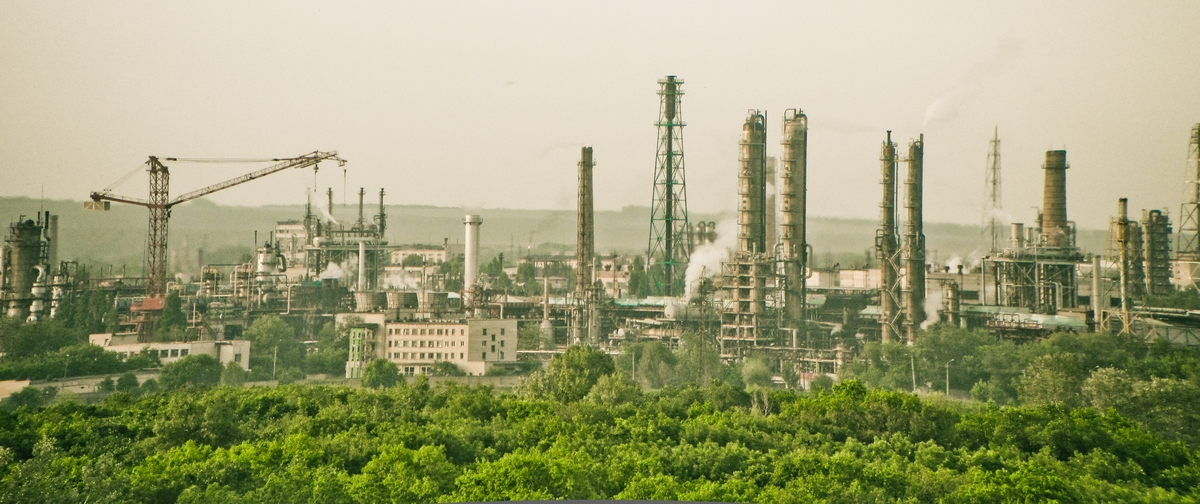
- Native name: Сєвєродонецьке об'єднання «Азот»
- Company type: Private joint stock company
- Industry: Chemical industry
- Predecessor: Lysychansk Nitrogen Fertilizer Plant
- Founded: 1951
- Headquarters: Sievierodonetsk, Luhansk Oblast, Ukraine
- Key people: Dmytro Firtash, Alex Rovt
- Products: nitrogen fertilizers, organic alcohols and acids, household chemicals, polymer products
- Number of employees: 7000 (2022)
- Parent: Ostchem Holding

Sievierodonetsk Association "Azot" is a chemical producer based in Sievierodonetsk, Luhansk Oblast, Ukraine. It is the third largest producer of ammonia in the country and one of the largest in Europe; producing nitrogen fertilizers, methanol, acetic acid, vinyl acetate, and their derivatives; acetylene, formalin, catalysts, household chemicals, and other chemical products. The successor of the Lysychansk Nitrogen Fertilizer Plant built in 1934, "Azot" produced its first output of ammonium nitrate on 1 January 1951. Sometime after the dissolution of the Soviet Union, the chemical plant was acquired by Ostchem Holding, part of Group DF run by Ukrainian oligarch Dmytro Firtash.

During the 2022 Russian invasion of Ukraine, "Azot" became the last Ukrainian-held position in the Battle of Sievierodonetsk, having sheltered soldiers and civilians. It was heavily damaged during the battle, as the transport workshop of the plant was shelled, igniting fuel and lubricants.

== Gallery ==
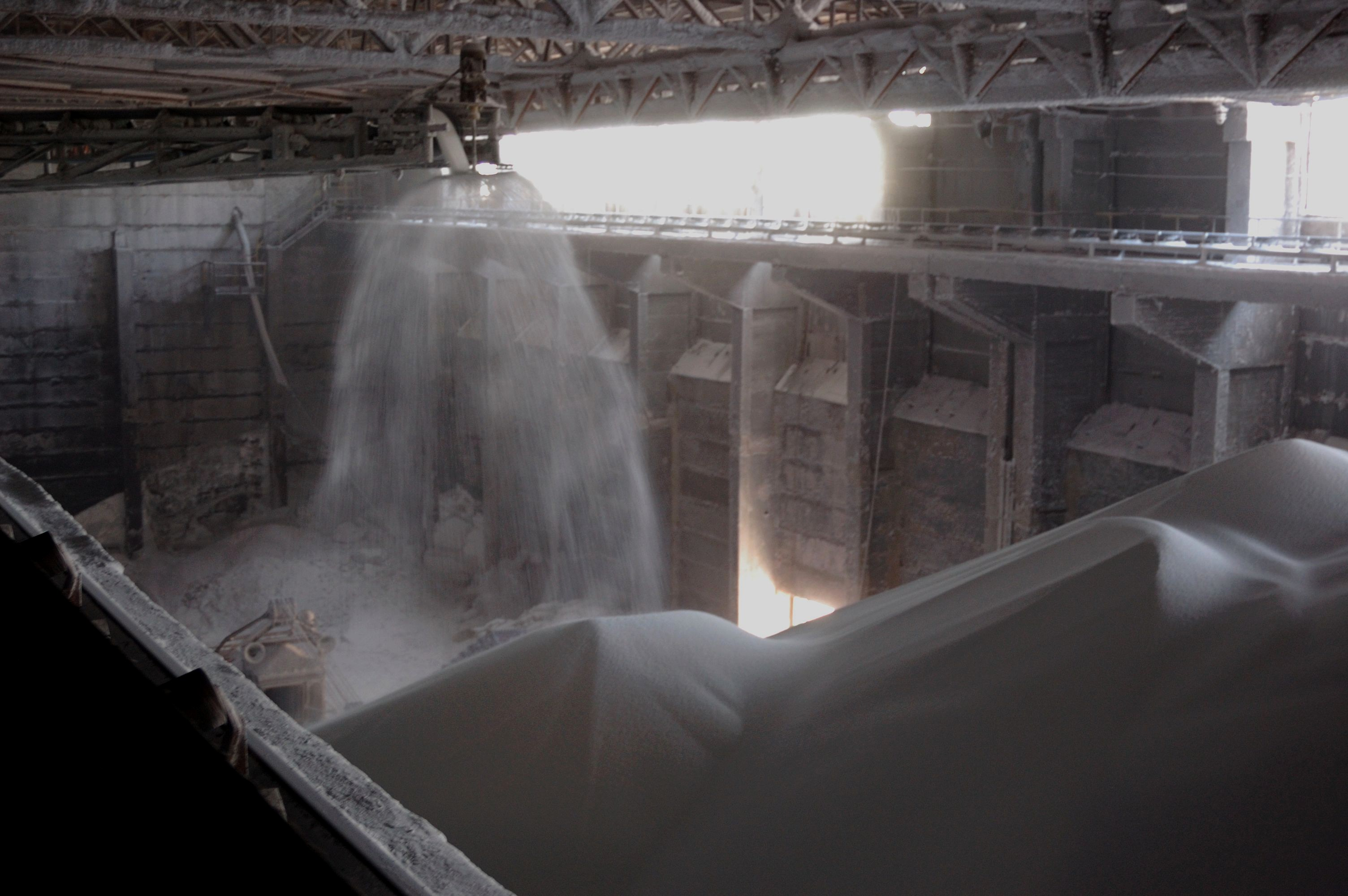
Carbamide silo

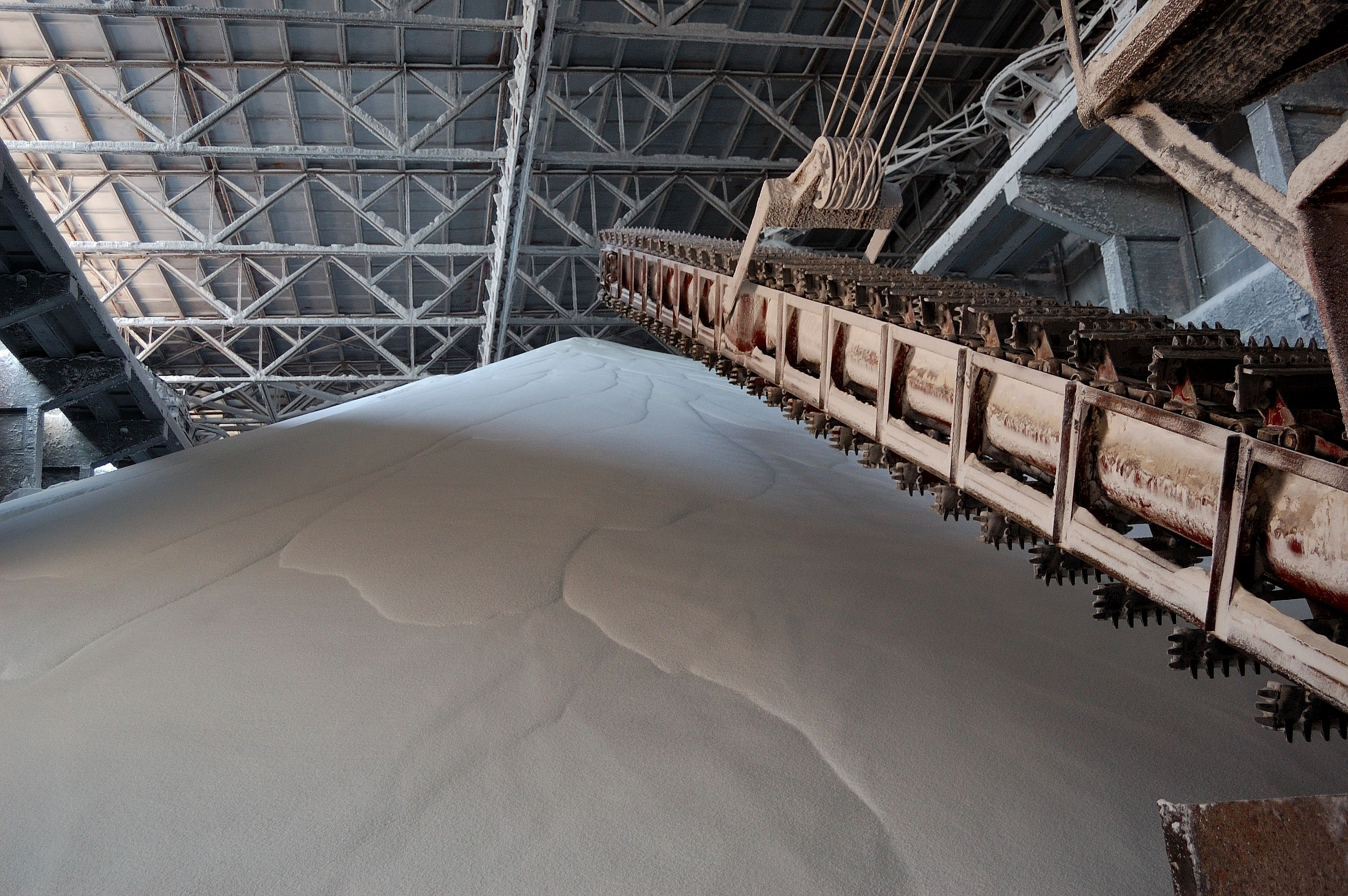
Carbamide silo

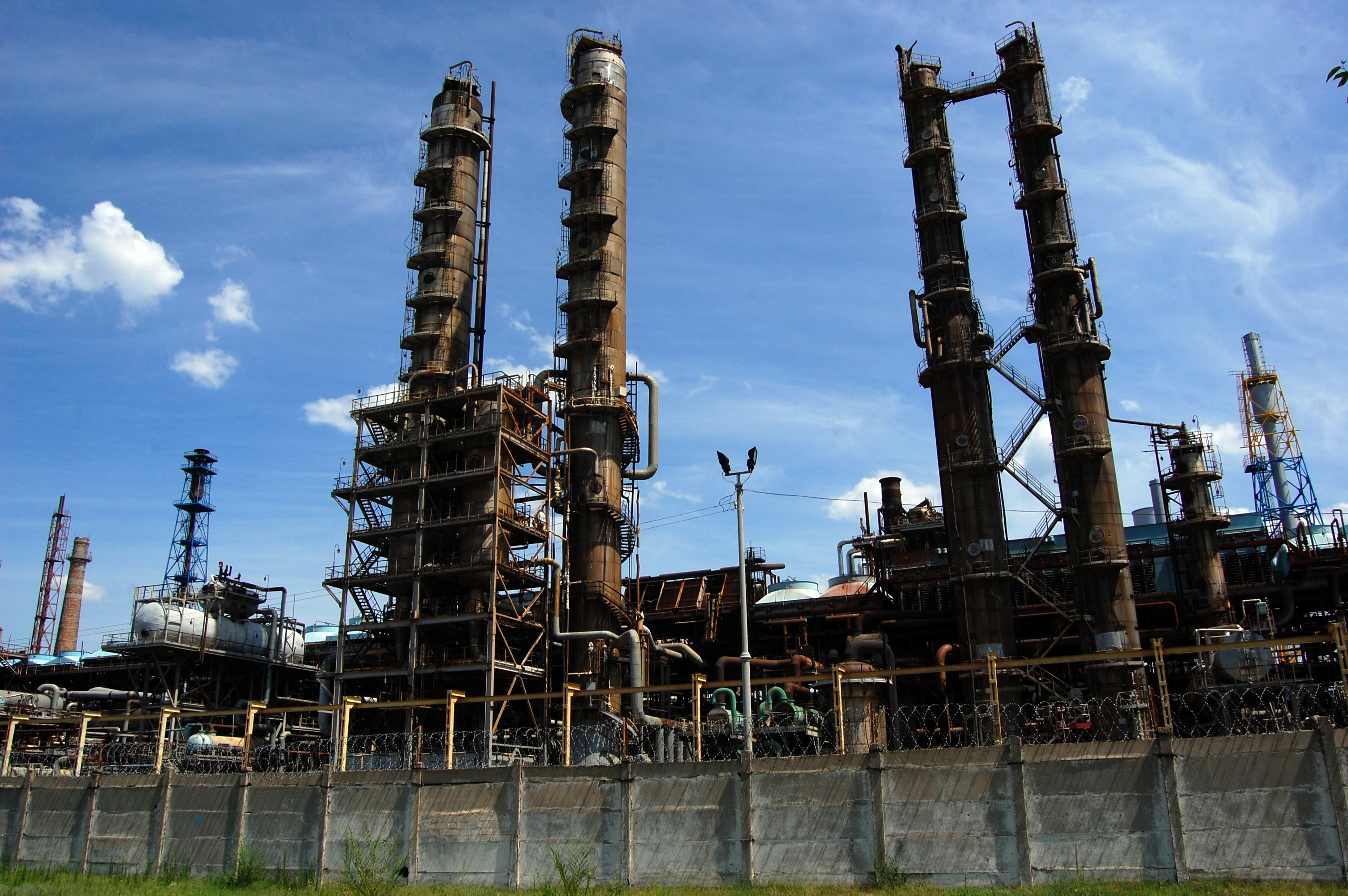
Ammonia shop

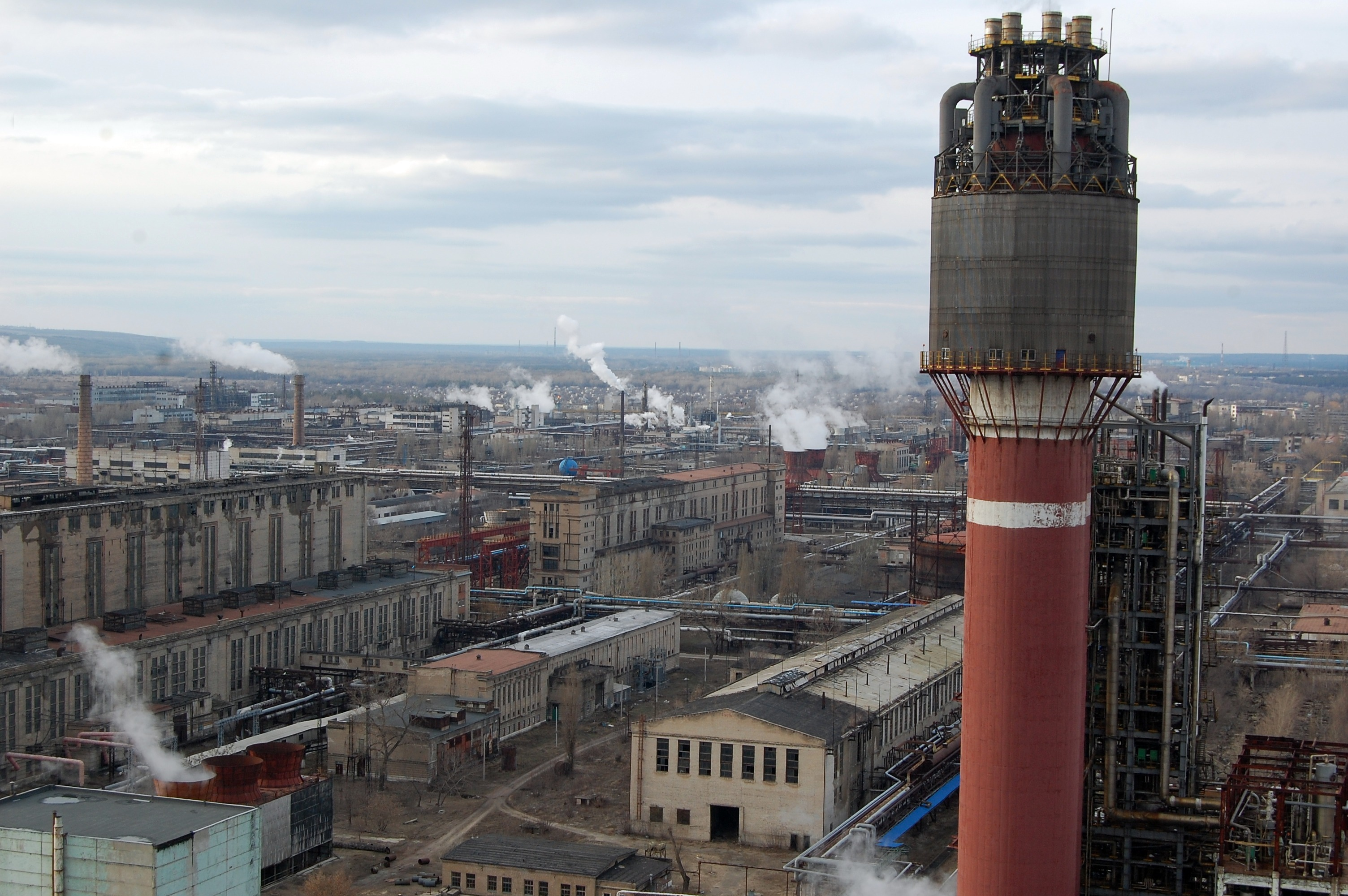
Azot

== See also ==
- Azovstal iron and steel works, last Ukrainian position in Mariupol before its fall to Russian forces
