= Azot (Cherkasy) =

Ukrainian nitrogen fertilizer manufacturer

Azot Private Joint-Stock Company

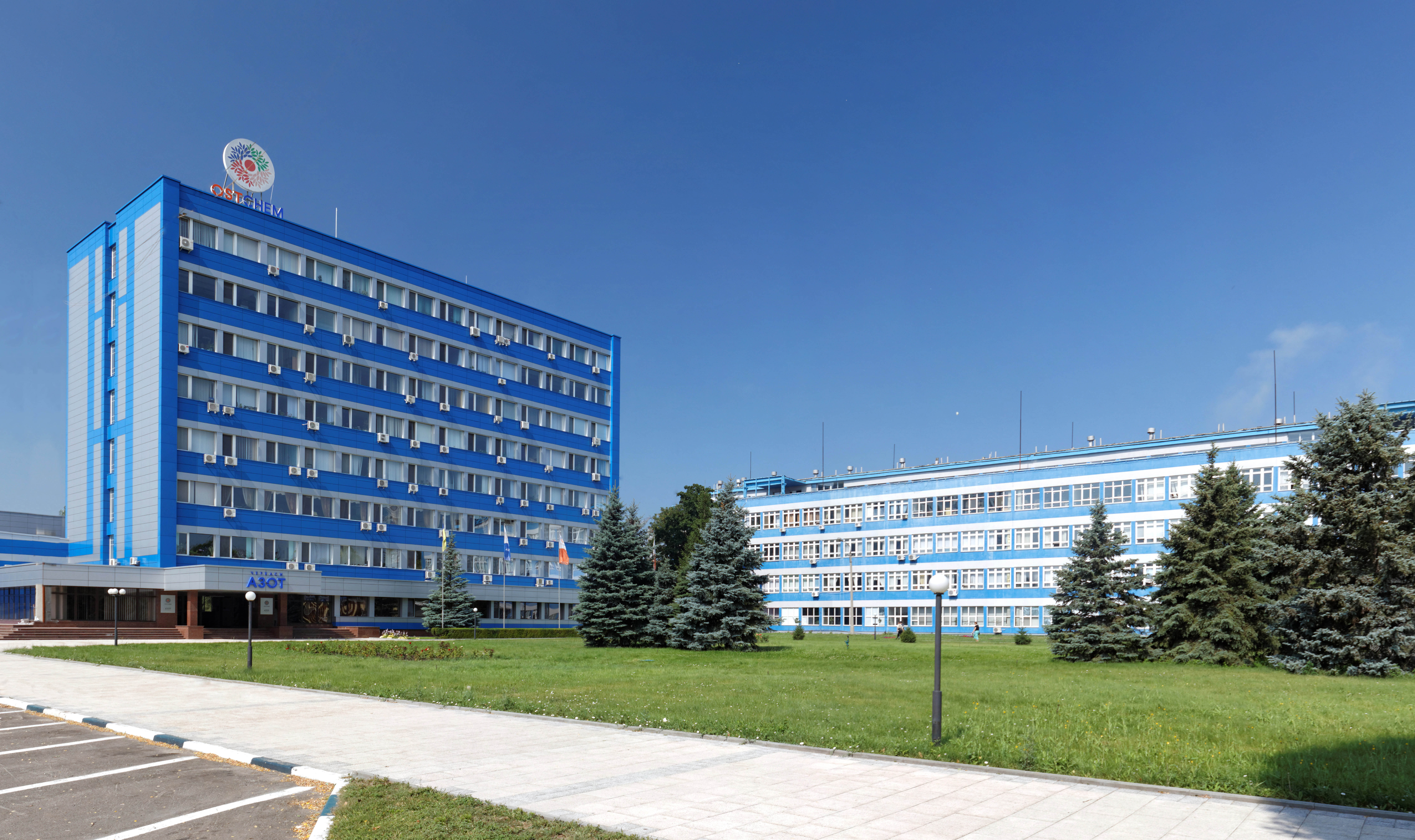
- Trade name: Cherkasy Azot
- Native name: Ukrainian: Приватне Акціонерне Товариство «Азот»
- Company type: Public Limited Company
- Industry: Chemical
- Founded: 1962
- Founder: Council of Ministers (Ukrainian SSR)
- Headquarters: Cherkasy, Ukraine
- Products: Nitrogen fertilizers
- Revenue: 5,575,826,000 hryvnia (2025)
- Total assets: 27,317,438,000 hryvnia (2025)
- Number of employees: 4500
- Parent: Ostchem Holding
- Website: ostchem.com/en/o-kompanii/proizvodstvo/azot

Azot PrAT, (Note: Ukrainian: ПрАТ «Азот», an abbreviation of "Private Joint-Stock Company 'Azot'" (Приватне Акціонерне Товариство «Азот»)) doing business as Cherkasy Azot, is a Ukrainian manufacturer of nitrogen fertilizers. Ukrainian oligarch Dmytro Firtash's chemical-industry holding corporation, Ostchem Holding, manages the company as well as several other fertilizer manufacturers in Ukraine and other post-Soviet states.

Azot serves both the domestic and export markets. Products are primarily ammonia and ammonium salts, but also include certain specialty ion-exchange resins.

The plant's name, Azot, is Ukrainian for "nitrogen", and Cherkasy is the location of its chemical plant.

== Overview ==
The plant began construction in 1962. On March 14, 1965, it released the first batch of liquid ammonia. By 2011, the company controlled 43 subdivisions on 500 hectares (1,200 acres) at the southern outskirts of Cherkasy city. These facilities have the capacity to produce up to 3 million tonnes of fertilizers per year, which can then be exported worldwide.

Products include:

- weak nitric acid
- granular ammonium nitrate
- ammonia, liquid or aqueous
- prilled urea
- urea-ammonium nitrate solution
- ammonium sulphate, aqueous or crystalline
- caprolactam, crystalline or liquid
- liquefied carbon dioxide, and
- ion-exchange resins, including annionite AV-17-8 and cationite.

== Effects of the 2022 invasion ==
The 2022 Russian invasion of Ukraine restrained export and import (the Black Sea harbours are blocked by the Russian Navy) of raw materials, and finished products. It has also reduced domestic demand for fertilizers, due to a reduction in crop planting.

== Philanthropy ==
The company's ultimate owner, Dmytro Firtash, has developed the "Save Your City Ukrainian: Збережи своє місто" brand for his philanthropic endeavours. The company financed renovation of the "Friendship of Peoples" concert hall and public plaza in downtown Cherkasy. In the surrounding area, it has paid for road repairs and trolleybus transfer center improvements; renovated schools; and manages a children's hospital specializing in neurological disorders.
