= Hlukhiv, Lviv Oblast =

Village in Lviv Oblast, Ukraine

Hlukhiv Глухів
- Village
- Location in Lviv Oblast Location in Ukraine
- Coordinates: 50°22′08″N 24°07′30″E
- Country: Ukraine
- Oblast: Lviv Oblast
- Raion: Sheptytskyi Raion

Population (2023)
  - Total: 473
- Time zone: UTC+2 (EET)
  - Summer (DST): UTC+3 (EEST)

Hlukhiv (Ukrainian: Глухів) is a village in Sheptytskyi Raion, Lviv Oblast, Ukraine.

Hlukhiv is situated around 50 km North of Lviv, near to the villages of Ostriv and Vaniv. It has a population of 475.
