= 2007 Zasyadko mine disaster =

2007 coal mine explosion in Donetsk, Ukraine

- Location of Donetsk Oblast in Ukraine
- Date: November 18, 2007
- Location: Donetsk Oblast, Ukraine; 48°04′08″N 37°48′20″E
- Deaths: 101

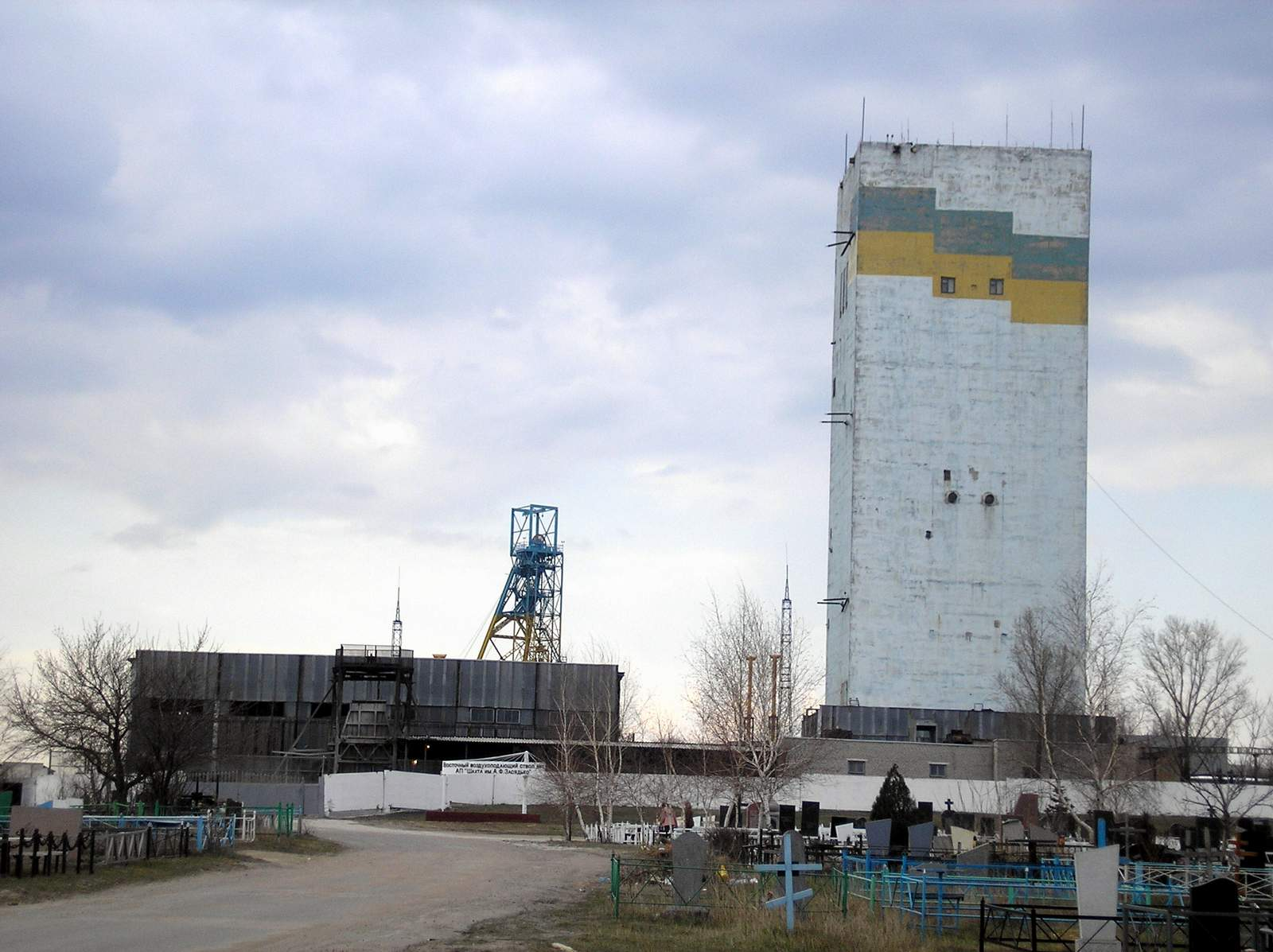
Eastern shaft of the Zasyadko coal mine. Local cemetery seen on the foreground is the burial place for most of the victims.

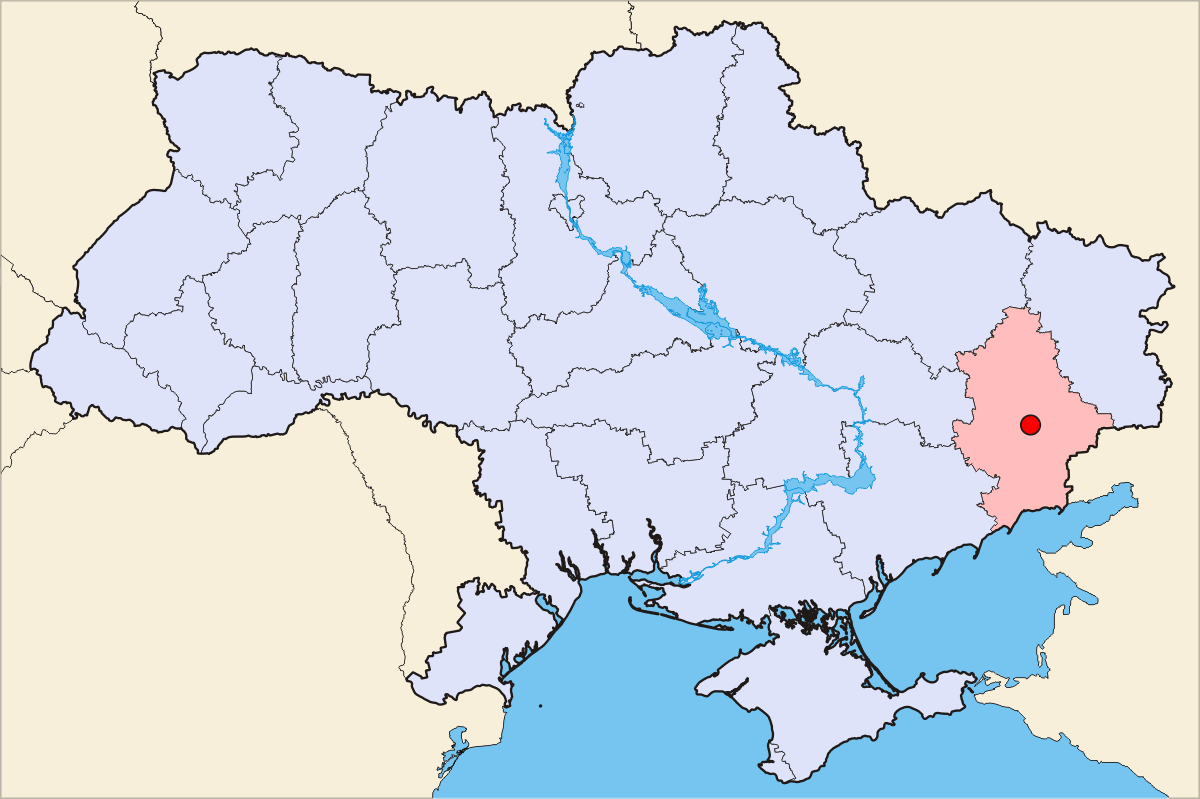
Location of Donetsk (red) and Donetsk Oblast (pink) on the map of Ukraine.

The 2007 Zasyadko mine disaster was a mining accident that happened on November 18, 2007 at the Zasyadko coal mine (Ukrainian: Шахта ім. Засядько) in the eastern Ukrainian city of Donetsk.

By November 30, 101 miners were reported dead: the worst accident in Ukraine's history. At the time of the explosion, 457 miners were in the complex.

== Causes and investigation ==
A methane explosion occurred more than 1,000 metres (3,281 ft) below ground level.

The Zasyadko Mine is considered one of the most dangerous coal mines in the world, An independent mining expert recently claimed that the company management, linked to a powerful local clan, interferes with hazard-measuring equipment on a permanent basis, in order to present underground situation as being within the safety standards, and so to prevent production from closure by the government inspectors. President Viktor Yushchenko blamed the cabinet for failing to “implement safe mining practices” in the coal industry. A criminal investigation is also underway.

== Government reaction ==
Families of the deceased miners were to receive compensations totaling ₴100,000, (approx. $20,000 USD) which constitutes part of the ₴15 million that the Government of Ukraine had set aside for renovation of the mine to prevent future accidents from happening.

On November 19, 2007, President Viktor Yushchenko signed a decree that calls for investigation into Zasyadko mine disaster as well as prevention of such disasters in the future. The President also signed a decree making November 20 a Day of National Mourning.

== Mining incidents trend ==
Within the decade leading up to the explosion, the frequency of mining incidents has increased in the Donbas coal region. The Zasyadko mine accident is the deadliest ever accident in Ukraine, surpassing the Barakova Mine accident in 2000, which killed at least 80 workers.

The Zasyadko Mine, Ukraine's largest and most equipped mine, employs 10,000 people and produces up to 10,000 tons of coal per day. Prior to this, four previous major mining accidents at the mine had killed a total of 148 workers combined.

=== Recurring incidents ===
Twelve days later, on December 1, 2007, at 5:55 local time another methane explosion happened in the same mine section injuring 52 miners. After this, at 21:20 local time on December 2, another explosion occurred, killing at least five workers and injuring 30 more.

== See also ==
- 2008 Ukraine coal mine collapse, a gas explosion in June 2008
