= Natural gas in Ukraine =

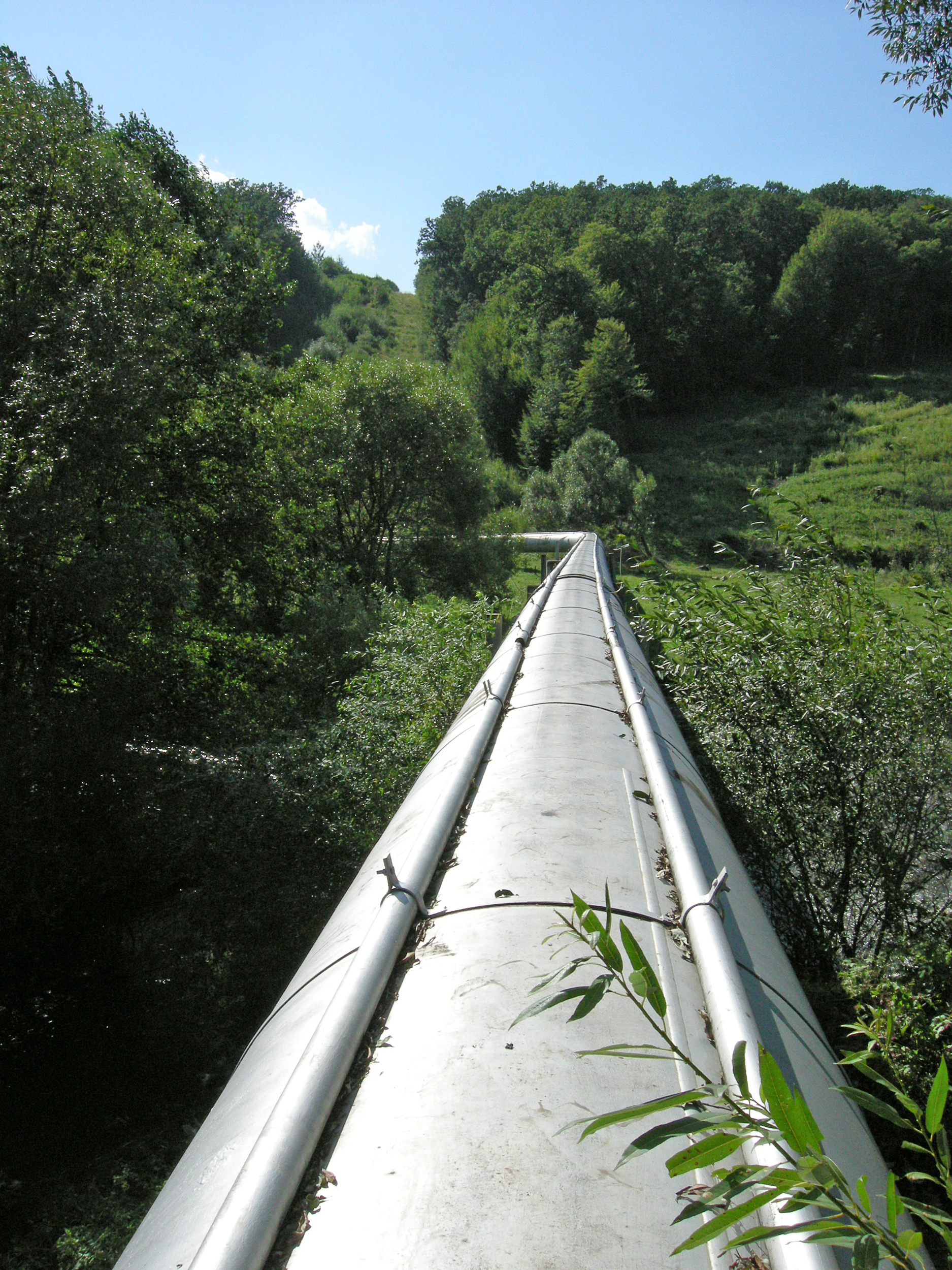
Ternopil

Gas is an important part of energy in Ukraine. About 20 billion cubic metres (26×10^{9} cu yd) of fossil gas is extracted each year, and since 2022 this has almost met demand, which in winter can reach 150 million cubic centimetres (9.2×10^{6} cu in) a day. Ukraine has the largest gas storage in Europe.

== Domestic production ==
Ukraine has been estimated to possess natural gas reserves of over 670 billion cubic metres (880×10^{9} cu yd) in 2022.

Domestic production peaked in 1975 at 68.1 billion cubic metres (89.1×10^{9} cu yd). (Note: Ukraine was part of the Soviet Union from 1920 until 24 August 1991, when Ukraine declared its independence.) Since then production gradually declined, stabilising in recent years at around 20 billion cubic centimetres (1.2×10^{9} cu in). (Note: In 2008, Ukraine's gas production was 21.014 bcm with natural gas output rising 1.7% to 19.985 bcm. Ukraine boosted gas production by 1.1% (year-on-year) during January–November 2009 to 19.413 billion cubic meters (bcm), with natural gas output rising 1.6% to 18.541 bcm.)

Ukraine aimed to increase natural gas production in the Black Sea from 1 billion cubic centimetres (0.061×10^{9} cu in) in 2011 to 3 billion cubic centimetres (0.18×10^{9} cu in) in 2015. In 2012, Black Sea production reached 1.2 billion cubic centimetres (0.073×10^{9} cu in) and was predicted to rise to 1.65 billion cubic centimetres (0.101×10^{9} cu in) in 2013. (Note: Ukraine has lost access to the Black Sea around Crimea to Russia. The status of Crimea and of the city of Sevastopol is currently under dispute between Russia and Ukraine; Ukraine and the majority of the international community consider Crimea to be an autonomous republic of Ukraine and Sevastopol to be one of Ukraine's cities with special status, while Russia, on the other hand, considers Crimea to be a federal subject of Russia and Sevastopol to be one of Russia's three federal cities.)

In 2012, Naftogaz and China Development Bank signed a deal to switch power and chemical production plants from natural gas to coal gasification technologies developed by China in order to reduce reliance on imported gas.

Over 70% of domestic gas production is extracted by UkrGasVydobuvannya, a subsidiary of the state-owned company Naftogaz. Private gas production companies in Ukraine are DTEK, Ukrnaftoburinnya, Burisma, Smart Energy, Poltava Petroleum Company, Geo Alliance Group, and KUB-GAS.

During the Soviet period, the Ukrainian SSR produced a record of 68.7 billion cubic centimetres (4.19×10^{9} cu in) in 1976. At the time of independence in 1991, production was at 26.6 billion cubic centimetres (1.62×10^{9} cu in), and fell in the 1990s to about 18 billion cubic centimetres (1.1×10^{9} cu in). Since the mid-2000s, production stabilised between 20 and 21 billion cubic centimetres (1.2×10^{9} and 1.3×10^{9} cu in), but was damaged by Russian attacks.

== Proven reserves ==
Ukrainian natural gas reserves (2019)
Region	Millions m^{3}
Kharkiv Oblast	317,630
Poltava Oblast	270,868
Lviv Oblast	72,272
Black Sea	37,506
Ivano-Frankivsk Oblast	30,556
Sumy Oblast	29,443
Autonomous Republic of Crimea	16,761
Dnipropetrovsk Oblast	13,079
Luhansk Oblast	12,591
Chernihiv Oblast	9,296
Chernivtsi Oblast	3,408
Zaporizhzhia Oblast	2,987
Zakarpattia Oblast	1,289
Volyn Oblast	1,022
Odesa Oblast	137
Donetsk Oblast	84
Azov Sea	14

== Consumers ==
Ukraine is a major natural gas consumer, being ranked thirteenth in the world and fifth in Europe. Consumption levels have fallen from 118 billion cubic centimetres (7.2×10^{9} cu in) in 1991 to less than 55 billion cubic centimetres (3.4×10^{9} cu in) in 2012, and from 50.4 billion cubic centimetres (3.08×10^{9} cu in) in 2013 to 29.8 billion cubic centimetres (1.82×10^{9} cu in) in 2019. Heavy industry is the largest consumer of natural gas in Ukraine (accounting for 40% of domestic consumption), followed by households (over 30%), and communal heating systems for government buildings and residential properties (20%).

Naftogaz stated in 2013 that only four Ukrainian Oblasts (provinces) made regular payments for natural gas. Ukraine announced in 2014 that household natural gas prices would rise by 50% in order to receive an IMF $14–18 billion rescue package. In the first seven months of 2014, gas consumption in Ukraine fell by 15%; this was amidst the Annexation of Crimea by the Russian Federation and the wider Russo-Ukrainian War.

=== Electricity generation ===
Many small gas-turbine generators are used, as these are more difficult to attack than large gas-fired or coal-fired power plants. Up to 700 MW of gas peakers may be installed before 2030.

== Imports ==
Despite its own production of natural gas, Ukraine still had to import about 80% of its natural gas needs in 1999. After 2008, the Ukrainian volume of imports of natural gas dropped. According to estimates from 2017, Ukraine domestically supplies 63.8% of its own gas consumption, whereas 36.2% is imported from other countries. Traditionally, Ukraine imported natural gas mainly from Turkmenistan and Russia (about two-thirds of its gas in 2012). Since November 2012, Ukraine has diversified its suppliers of imported natural gas. (Note: On 18 June 2013, Prime Minister Mykola Azarov stated "We currently buy gas from RWE and pump it through Poland, Slovakia and Hungary. This gas costs us less than the Russian gas that we buy on the border with Russia, and RWE sells us the same gas that it buys from Russia". He also stated that Ukraine annually overpaid Russia USD$7 billion for natural gas.) In January 2014, Ukrainian Energy and Coal Industry Minister Eduard Stavytsky stated that Ukraine (at that time) will buy only Russian natural gas "because it's currently the most profitable".

In June 2014, Russia halted its natural gas supplies to Ukraine because Ukraine refused to pay a debt to Gazprom of $4.5 billion that had arisen after Russia denounced the 2010 Kharkiv Pact in March 2014. In June 2014, Ukraine increased imports of natural gas from Poland and Hungary. Ukraine has not bought gas directly from Russia since 2015, sourcing it instead from traders of the gas which is transported through Ukraine to be sold elsewhere in Europe. Winter consumption is usually supplied about equally from production and withdrawals from storage, but in early 2025 imports may have to be increased due to wartime damage to production and low storage levels.

=== Prices of import ===
Disputes over gas prices have led to several economic conflicts with Russia since 1990. After 2004, Russia began to steadily raise the price of its natural gas exports to Ukraine, aiming to bring prices in line with the rates paid by other European states. Until 2005, Ukraine was charged $0.05 per cubic metre ($0.038/yd^{3}); the price rose to $0.426 per cubic metre ($0.326/yd^{3}) in 2012. In January 2013, Ukraine paid $0.43 per cubic metre ($0.33/yd^{3}). (Note: In June 2013, per 1,000 m^{3}, Ukraine paid $421.7 for natural gas from Russia, $388.6 for natural gas from Germany, and $406.6 for natural gas from Hungary.)

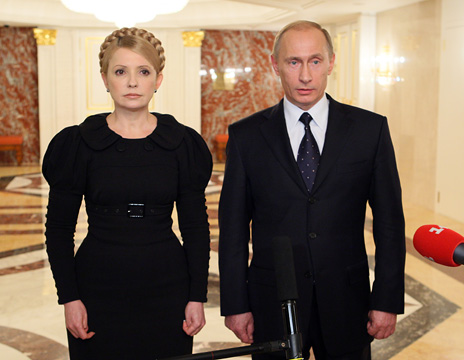
The Ukrainian and Russian prime ministers Yulia Tymoshenko and Vladimir Putin making a joint press statement on 18 January 2009. after they reached a deal on restoring gas supplies to Europe and Ukraine

These rapid price increases raised Ukraine's annual cost of gas imports from less than $4 billion in 2005 to $14 billion in 2011 and 2012. Natural gas is Ukraine's biggest import at present and is the main cause of the country's structural trade deficit.

In the 17 December 2013 Ukrainian–Russian action plan, it was agreed that the cost of Russian natural gas supplied to Ukraine would be lowered to $0.268 per cubic metre ($0.205/yd^{3}) from a price of more than $0.40 in December 2013.

During the Russo-Ukrainian War, which started in February 2014 with the Russian military invasion of Crimea, severe tensions extended to the gas sector. The EU commissioner for energy, Günther Oettinger, was called in to broker a deal securing supplies to Ukraine and transit to the EU. The package signed in October 2014 included Russian supplies of gas to Ukraine from November 2014 through March 2015, conditional on the payment of undisputed Ukrainian gas debt ($3 billion). The price for November and December 2014 was set at $0.378 per cubic metre ($0.289/yd^{3}), to be adjusted in January. Deliveries were to be prepaid. During that winter, Ukrainian monopoly Naftogaz was able to import limited quantities of gas from the EU (reverse flow from Slovakia, Poland, and Hungary) at Central European hub prices, around $0.25 per cubic metre ($0.19/yd^{3}).

In 2014, due to a severe drop in the oil market price (the price halved between the middle and end of the year), Gazprom had to reduce the oil-linked gas price. In January 2014, Naftogaz and Russia's Gazprom signed a supplement to the Russian-Ukrainian gas contract, setting the price of natural gas for Ukraine in the first quarter of 2014 at $0.2685 per cubic metre ($0.2053/yd^{3}).

=== Reverse flow ===
After the end of gas purchases from the Russian Federation in November 2015, Ukraine started to purchase natural gas from Poland, Slovakia, and Hungary, and is planning a provisional pipeline from Romania through Moldova. There was no physical reverse flow, but a virtual reverse flow (also known as "netting"). Ukraine bought natural gas from international gas traders as part of the volumes that Gazprom sent westwards through Ukraine.

== Transmission ==
The natural gas transmission system of Ukraine is a complex of pipelines for import and transit of gas in Ukraine. It is one of the largest gas transmission systems in the world. The system is linked with the systems of Poland, Romania, Moldova, Hungary and Slovakia, and was formerly linked with the natural gas transmission systems of Russia and Belarus. The system is owned by Government of Ukraine and operated by Gas Transmission System Operator of Ukraine. Some local transmission lines together with distribution sets are owned by regional gas companies.

=== Technical description ===
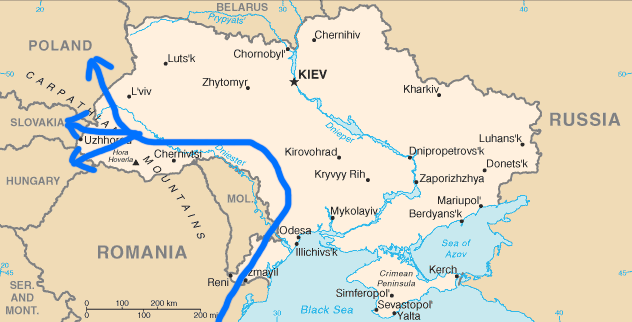
Usually LNG from Greece and piped gas from the Trans-Balkan pipeline from Turkey is pumped north up the vertical corridor. It is then either used or stored in Ukraine or sent west to central Europe. Occasionally however gas is sent east from central Europe to Ukraine.

The natural gas transmission system of Ukraine consists of 38,550 kilometres (23,950 mi) of pipelines, including 22,160 kilometres (13,770 mi) of trunk pipelines and 16,390 kilometres (10,180 mi) of branch pipelines. In addition, the system includes 72 compressor stations with 702 compressors, having a total capacity of 5,442.9 megawatts (7,299,000 hp), and 13 underground gas storage facilities with an active storage capacity of 30.9 billion cubic metres (1.09 trillion cubic feet).

As of 2024, 1 million cubic metres (1.3×10^{6} cu yd) can be imported from the Trans-Balkan pipeline through the Orlivka gas metering and compressor station, and this is expected to increase to 7 million in 2025.

As of 2009, the system had import capacity of 288 billion cubic metres (10.2 trillion cubic feet) and export capacity of 178 billion cubic metres (6.3 trillion cubic feet) per year.

Before 2012, gas entered to Ukraine only from entry points on borders with Russia and Belarus. Most of the gas transit went to Slovakia and further to other countries in Central and Western Europe. Smaller amount of natural gas was transported to Hungary, Poland, Romania, and Moldova. In 2012–2014, some entry/exit points with Poland, Hungary, and Slovakia were modified to also allow the gas flow to be reversed from these countries back into Ukraine.

The value of the Ukrainian transmission system is estimated at US$9–25 billion. In 2004, the Ukrainian Centre for Economic and Political Studies estimated its value at $12–13 billion.

=== Underground gas storages ===
Ukraine has 12 gas storage facilities operated by Ukrtransgaz. Five of these are located in Western Ukraine, two in Central Ukraine and five in Eastern Ukraine. In addition one gas storage, the Hlibivske storage facility, operated by Chornomornaftogaz, is located in Crimea and currently is not controlled by Ukraine authorities. The largest storage is Bilche–Volytsko–Ugerske in Western Ukraine having more than half of the Ukrainian total storage capacity.

=== Rehabilitation and modernization ===
In 2009, Ukraine, the European Commission, European Bank for Reconstruction and Development, European Investment Bank and the World Bank signed a joint declaration on the modernisation of the Ukrainian gas transmission System. The European Union financed the feasibility study which was conducted by Mott MacDonald. According to the master plan of Ukrtransgas, the priority objects are Soyuz, Progress, Urengoy–Pomary–Uzhhorod, Yelets–Kremenchuk–Kryvyi Rih and Ananyiv–Tiraspol–Izmail pipelines, Bilche–Volytsko–Ugerske and Bohorodchany underground gas storages, and Uzhhorod, Berehove, Drozdovychi, Tekove and Orlivka gas metering stations. The priority investment programme requires US$3.2 billion, $342 million for storage and $2.85 billion for pipelines and compressors.

=== History ===
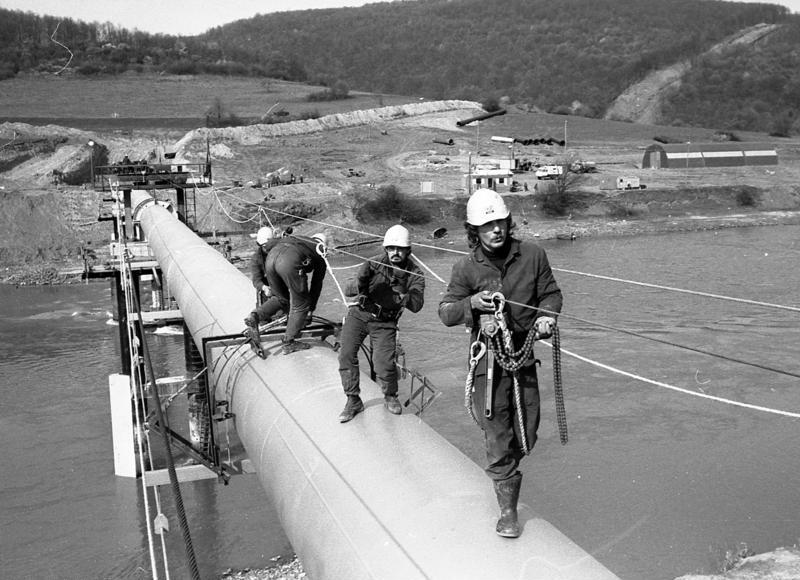
Constructing a pipeline over the Dniester (April 1983)

The development of Ukrainian gas pipeline system started in Galicia, then part of Poland. The first gas pipeline was the Boryslav–Drohobych pipeline in 1912. In 1924, after the discovery of the Dashava gas field the Dashava–Stryi–Drohobych gas pipeline was constructed. In 1928, the Dashava–Lviv and in 1937, the Dashava–Tarnów pipelines were built. After the Soviet annexation of Eastern Galicia, the Dashava–Tarnów pipeline became the first cross-border pipeline of the Soviet Union. the Opory–Boryslav and Opory–Lviv pipelines were built in 1940–1941.

The current Ukrainian transmission system was built as an integrated part of the Unified Gas Supply System of the former Soviet Union. In the 1940–1960s, it was mainly built to use the Galician gas in other regions of the Soviet Union. In 1948, the Dashava–Kyiv pipeline which, at that time, was the largest pipeline in Europe, was launched. In 1951, the Dashava–Kyiv pipeline was extended to Bryansk and Moscow. In 1955, construction of the Dashava–Minsk pipeline started, which was later extended to Vilnius and Riga. It was completed in 1960. After the discovery of the Shebelinka gas field in 1956, the Shebelinka–Kharkiv pipeline and the Shebelinka–Dnipropetrovsk–Kryvyi Rih–Odesa pipeline with branches to Zaporizhzhia, Mykolaiv and Kherson were completed in 1966. This southern corridor was extended to Moldova and later to Southeast Europe between 1974 and 1978. The Shebelinka–Kyiv pipeline with branches to Poltava and Kremenchuk was completed in 1969. In 1970–1974, it was extended to the Western border. Also the Shebelinka–Belgorod–Kursk–Bryansk pipeline was built. In 1964, the first underground gas storage in Ukraine, the Olyshevske gas storage, was commissioned.

In 1970–1980s, the Ukrainian gas transmission system was developed as a gas export route to Europe. The first large-scale export pipeline, the Dolyna–Uzhhorod–Western border pipeline, became operational in 1967. It was the first stage of the Bratstvo (Brotherhood) pipeline system. In 1978, the Soyuz pipeline (Orenburg–Western border pipeline) was built as the first Soviet natural gas export pipeline. It was followed by the Urengoy–Pomary–Uzhhorod pipeline in 1983 (now also named as Bratstvo or Brotherhood pipeline) and the Progress pipeline (Yamburg–Western border pipeline) in 1988. Between 1986 and 2001, the Yelets–Kremenchuk–Ananyiv–Tiraspol–Izmail route was developed.

==== Transit from Russia until 2024 ====
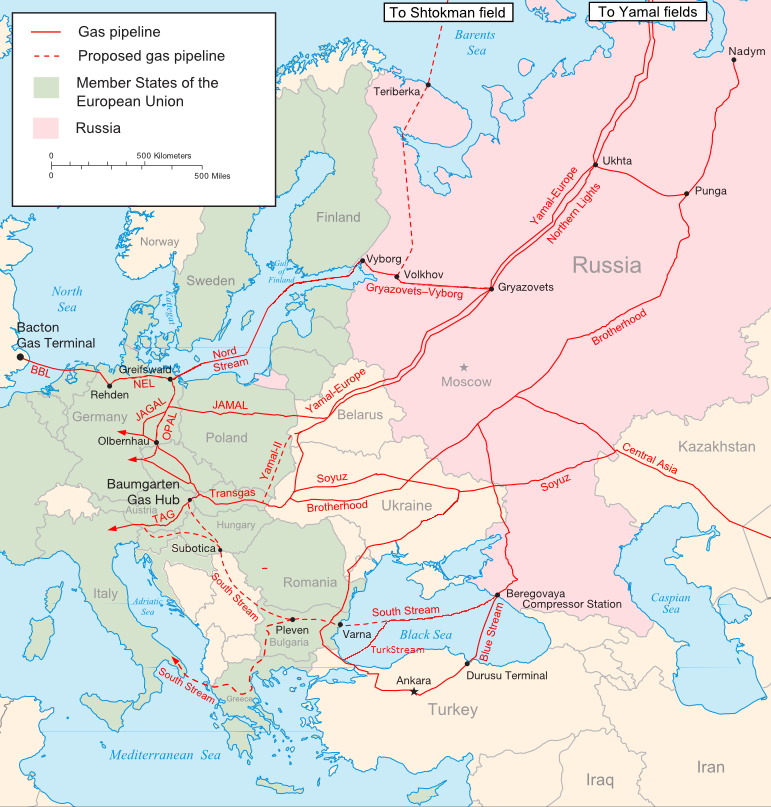
Major Russian gas pipelines to Europe (2021)

The gas transmission system of Ukraine could be divided into three transit corridors which are the western transit corridor, the southern transit corridor, and the north–south internal corridor for Russian domestic gas transportation.

Ukraine stopped buying gas directly from Russia in 2015, to reduce gas dependence after the outbreak of the Russo-Ukrainian war. The contract to transit Russian gas expired at the end of 2024.

===== Western corridor =====
Main pipelines of the western corridor, also known as the Bratstvo or Brotherhood pipeline system, are the Soyuz pipeline (Orenburg–Western border pipeline), the Progress pipeline (Yamburg–Western border pipeline) and the Urengoy–Pomary–Uzhhorod pipeline. In addition, it consist of the Yelets–Kursk–Dykanka pipeline, the Kursk–Kyiv pipeline, the Kyiv–Western border pipeline, the Komarno–Drozdovychi pipeline, the Ivatsevichy–Dolyna pipeline, the Torzhok–Smolensk–Mazyr–Dolyna pipeline, the Uzhhorod–Berehove pipeline, the Dolyna–Uzhhorod pipeline, and the Khust–Satu Mare pipeline.

The Soyuz pipeline, originating from the Orenburg gas field, enters to Ukraine east of Novopskov through the Sokhranovka gas metering station in Russia. Up to Novopskov, it runs parallel to the Orenburg–Novopskov pipeline. From there, the Soyuz pipeline runs westward until near Bar it joins the corridor of the Urengoy–Pomary–Uzhhorod and Progress pipelines. It leaves Ukraine through the Uzhhorod gas metering and pumping station. Length of the Ukrainian section of the Soyuz pipeline is 1,567 kilometres (974 mi) and it has capacity of 26.1 billion cubic metres (920 billion cubic feet) per year.

The Progress pipeline, originating from the Yamburg gas field, runs mostly parallel to the Urengoy–Pomary–Uzhhorod pipeline. It enters Ukraine north of Sumy through the Sudzha gas metering station in Russia and leaves through the Uzhhorod gas metering and pumping station. The Ukrainian section has length of 1,120 kilometres (700 mi) and it has capacity of 28.5 billion cubic metres (1.01 trillion cubic feet) per year.

The Urengoy–Pomary–Uzhhorod pipeline, originating from the Urengoy gas field, enters Ukraine at the Sudzha gas metering station like Progress, the Kursk–Kyiv and the Yelets–Kursk–Dykanka pipelines. In Ukraine, it takes gas through to the Uzhhorod gas metering and pumping station on the Ukrainian border with Slovakia. Length of the Ukrainian section is 1,160 kilometres (720 mi) and it has capacity of 29.7 billion cubic metres (1.05 trillion cubic feet) per year.

The Yelets–Kursk–Dykanka and the Kursk–Kyiv pipeline enters Ukraine through the Sudzha gas metering station. The Torzhok–Smolensk–Mazyr–Dolyna pipeline enters Ukraine through the Mazyr gas metering station and the Ivatsevichy–Dolyna pipeline enters through the Kobryn gas metering station, both in Belarus.The Komarno–Drozdovychi pipeline enters to Poland through the Drozdovychi metering station, the Uzhhorod–Berehove pipeline enters to Hungary through the Berehove metering station, and the Khust–Satu Mare pipeline enters to Romania through the Tekove metering station.

In 2023 only the pipeline through the Sudzha gas metering station was operational to bring gas from Russia, transporting 14.4 billion cubic centimetres (0.88×10^{9} cu in).

===== Southern corridor =====
Main pipelines of the southern transit corridor are the Yelets–Kremenchuk–Kryvyi Rih pipeline, the Shebelinka–Dnipropetrovsk–Kryvyi Rih–Rozdilna–Izmail pipeline, the Kremenchuk–Ananyiv–Bohorodchany pipeline, the Ananyiv–Tiraspol–Izmail pipeline, and the Rozdilna–Izmail pipeline. The gas import pipelines are the Ostrogozhsk–Shebelinka pipeline, the Urengoy–Novopskov pipeline, the Petrovsk–Novopskov pipeline, and the Orenburg–Novopskov pipeline.

The Yelets–Kremenchuk–Kryvyi Rih pipeline enters into Ukraine through the Sudzha gas metering station. Length of the Ukrainian section of this pipeline is 323 kilometres (201 mi) and it has capacity of 32 billion cubic metres (1.1 trillion cubic feet) per year. Length of the Kremenchuk–Ananyiv–Chernivtsi–Bohorodchany pipeline is 351 kilometres (218 mi) and it has capacity of 30 billion cubic metres (1.1 trillion cubic feet) per year. It enters Moldova through the Hrebenyky gas metering station and the reverse flow enters through the Oleksiyivka gas metering station. The Ananyiv–Tiraspol–Izmail pipeline enters Moldova through the Hrebenyky gas metering station, and the Shebelinka–Dnipropetrovsk–Kryvyi Rih–Izmail and the Rozdilna–Izmail pipelines enter through the Ryasnopil (Rozdilna) gas metering station. After re-entering Ukraine all three pipelines exit to Romania and connect to the Trans-Balkan pipeline through the Orlivka gas metering and compressor station. Length of the Ananyiv–Tiraspol–Izmail pipeline is 256 kilometres (159 mi) and it has capacity of 23.7 billion cubic metres (840 billion cubic feet) per year.

The Ostrogozhsk–Shebelinka pipeline enters Ukraine through the Valuyki gas metering station, the Orenburg–Novopskov pipelines enters through the Sokhranovka gas metering station, and the Urengoy–Novopskov and the Petrovsk–Novopskov enter through the Pisarevka gas metering station, all in Russia.

Crimea is connected to the main gas transportations system (Shebelinka–Dnipropetrovsk–Kryvyi Rih–Rozdilna–Izmail pipeline) through the Marivka–Kherson–Crimea pipeline. In Krasnoperekopsk Raion, Crimea, one branch runs to the Hlibivske storage facility, one branch runs to Dzhankoy, Feodosia and Kerch, and one branch runs to Simferopol and Sevastopol.

===== North–south Russian domestic corridor =====
This corridor, crossing Luhansk Oblast in Eastern Ukraine, consists of the Southern Caucasus–Centre pipeline system. Main pipelines of this corridor are the Krasnodar–Serpukhov pipeline and the Stavropol–Moscow pipeline, entering to Ukraine through the Prokhorivka gas metering station in south and the Serebryanka gas metering station in north. After Russia built the Sokhranovka–Oktyabrskaya bypass and the Petrovsk–Frolovo–Izobilnoye pipeline, this corridor through Ukraine is not in use. However, during the Russian invasion of Ukraine Russia used this corridor to supply Donbas regions not controlled by the Ukrainian Government through the Prokhorivka and Platovo gas metering stations.

==== Ukraine as transit route of natural gas ====
In 2020, Ukraine transited more natural gas than any other country in the world, and it remained the main transit route for Russian natural gas sold to Europe, which earned Ukraine about USD$3 billion per year in transit fees, making it the country's most lucrative export service. Following Russia's launch of the Nord Stream pipeline, which bypasses Ukraine, gas transit volumes steadily decreased. In 2004, more than 120 billion cubic centimetres (7.3×10^{9} cu in) of Russian gas was transported through Ukraine; this figure dropped to 84 billion cubic centimetres (5.1×10^{9} cu in).

The Russia–Ukraine gas disputes left many countries with a significant drop in their supplies when Russia cut off all natural gas supplies passing through Ukraine in 2009 and 2006. The transit of Russian gas to Europe ceased at the end of 2024.

== Shale gas ==
Ukraine's largest natural gas fields are about 80–85% depleted, although there are still large quantities of unexploited gas reserves stored in hard-to-reach areas or solid rock. Ukraine has Europe's third largest shale gas reserves, at 1.2 trillion cubic metres (1.6×10^{12} cu yd).

There are two potentially large shale gas fields. The Yuzivska gas field located in Donetsk Oblast and Kharkiv Oblast, and the Olesska gas field in Lviv Oblast and Ivano-Frankivsk Oblast. Ukraine signed a 50-year production sharing agreement with Royal Dutch Shell on 25 January 2013 involving the Yuzivska shale gas field. The $10 billion deal was the largest foreign direct investment ever for Ukraine. Full shale gas production was expected to depend on successful results from 15 test wells. In September 2013, Ukrainian Prime Minister Mykola Azarov stated that the (containing all expenditures) price of shale gas would be $120–130 per 1,000 cubic meters. In November 2013, Ukraine signed a $10 billion shale gas production-sharing agreement with Chevron Corporation to develop the Olesska gas field. The Ukrainian government projected that the Yuzivska and Olesska projects together could provide Ukraine with an additional 11 to 16 bcm of natural gas per year by 2018. By 2030, a production of 6–11 bcm of shale gas a year is called for in Ukrainian Government plans.

Ukraine originally expected commercial shale gas extraction to begin in 2017, (Note: On 13 September 2013, Prime Minister Mykola Azarov expected that extraction of shale gas in Ukraine would begin from 2015.) but Shell pulled out of the Yuzivska project in 2015 as a consequence of the nearby war in the Donbas, a collapse in European natural gas prices, and opposition from local residents. Similarly, Chevron abandoned the Olesska project in the west of Ukraine due to increased geopolitical risks and a collapse in European natural gas prices.

== Storage ==
There is 31 bcm of underground storage in Ukraine.

== 2022 Russian invasion ==
In 2021, the year before the invasion, Ukraine produced 19.8 billion cubic meters (bcm or Gm^{3}) of natural gas. To satisfy domestic demand of 27.3 bcm that year, Ukraine relied on gas imports (2.6 bcm) and withdrawal from underground storage (4.9 bcm). Winter demand can reach 150 mcm per day.

Some pipelines in Ukraine were damaged by the 2022 Russian invasion of Ukraine. However as of 2024 the gas grid is thought to be generally secure, in part due to the large amount of spare capacity.

== See also ==
- 2022 Russia–European Union gas dispute – Fossil fuel financing-related conflicts
- Energy in Ukraine
- Russia–Ukraine gas disputes – Disputes between Naftogaz Ukrayiny and Gazprom
