= Raul-Yuri Ervier =

Russian explorer and geologist

Raul-Yuri Georgievich Ervier
- Born: 16 April 1909; Tiflis, Russian Empire
- Died: 9 August 1991 (aged 87); Moscow, Russia
- Occupation: geologist
- Children: Yuri Yurievich Ervier, Aleksandr Yurievich Ervier, Maria Yurievna Ervier
- Parent(s): Georgy Ivanovich Ervier and Tamara Grigorievna Ervier
- Awards: Order of Lenin (1963 and 1976)

Raul-Yuri Georgievich Ervier (Russian: Рауль-Юрий Георгиевич Эрвье; 16 April 1909 – 9 August 1991) was a Soviet geologist and director of the main Tyumen production geological department (“Glavtyumengeologiya”). He was head of wide-ranging geological explorations that discovered of the largest oil and gas fields in Western Siberia.

== Biography ==
He was born 16 April 1909 in Tiflis, to a French emigrant’s family. He finished school in his native town. In 1923 he began working as a student - assistant of a foreman of a soap plant in Tbilisi.

In 1929 he joined the Melitopol gas expedition. Since that moment he was linked with geology until the end of his life. In 1933 he finished the High Engineer Courses in Kiev. He worked with various geological groups in Ukraine until 1941.

He served in the Great Patriotic War after August 1941. He served in sapper units, was the commander of individual detachment of deep drilling of a sapper battalion. Took part in defense and liberation of Ukraine and Northern Caucasus. He was demobilized in December 1944 at the rank of major – engineer.

From 1945 through 1952 Ervier worked as the head of South – Moldavian oil exploration of trust “Moldavneftegeologiya”.

In August 1952 he was assigned to Tyumen oil and gas exploring expedition. Since 1955 he was the main engineer of Tyumen gas and oil exploring trust. Since 1956 he was the director of the trust, later the department of “Tyumenneftegeologiya”. The head of main committee “Glavtyumengeologiya” in 1966-1977.

On 29 April 1963 Yuri Georgievich Ervier was awarded the star of the Hero of Socialist Labour and the order of Lenin and a gold medal “Hammer and Sickle” for outstanding achievements in discovering and exploration of mineral deposits.

In April 1964 he was among the group of specialists and scientists awarded the Lenin Prize for “grounding of aspects of foulness and oil – bearing capacity of Western Siberia plain”.

"It has been foreordained to him to create and to head the group of like-minded persons, who discovered the largest deposits of hydrocarbons, which allowed Russia to get the rank of one of leading gas and oil powers of the world… Many people of those, who finished his school, came up to head Tyumen geological exploring…"

— “Epoch of Ervier”

Such people, as F. K. Salmanov, A. M. Brehuntsov, V. T. Podshibyakin, V. D. Tokarev, L. I. Rovnin, I. Y. Girya, A. G. Yudin, V. A. Abazarov, have honourably continued the course, started by Y. G. Ervier.

During his management more than 250 fields of oil and gas were discovered, some of them are unique: Mamontovskoe, Pravdinskoe, Samotlorskoe, Fedorovskoe, Holmogorskoe (of oil) and Zapolyarnoe, Medveshye, Urengoyskoe, Yamburgskoe (of gas). Explored supplies of oil are estimated at 10 billions tons, condensate - at 0.5 billions tons, gas – at 20 trillions m^3.

In 1977 he was appointed deputy minister of geology of the USSR and held this position until retirement in 1981.

On 16 April 1984 for his contribution to development of a national economy of Tyumen, its formation as the center of an oil and gas extraction complex of Western Siberia, Yuri Ervier got the rank of the honourable citizen of Tyumen.

Yuri Georgievich Ervier died on 9 August 1991 in Moscow. He was buried in Thervishevskoe graveyard in Tyumen, to the right of its main entrance.

== Awards ==
- Hero of Socialist Labour (1963)
- Two Orders of Lenin (1963, 1976)
- Order of the October Revolution (1971)
- Order of the Red Banner of Labour, twice (1959, 1968)
- Order of the Patriotic War, 2nd class (1985)
- Order of the Red Star (1943)
- Medal "For the Defence of Odessa"
- Medal "For the Defence of the Caucasus"
- Medal "For the Victory over Germany in the Great Patriotic War 1941–1945"
- Lenin Prize (1964)

== Memorials ==
His name was given to a street in Tyumen and a charity fund of Russian geologists.

On 14 April 2006 in Tyumen a monument to Ervier who had worked in “Glavtyumengeologiya” for many years was opened in Respublika street. The text on the monument says: “To Ervier Yuri Georgievich – from grateful Tyumen”.
