= Urengoy (disambiguation) =

Urengoy may refer to:

- Urengoy, an urban-type settlement in Yamalo-Nenets Autonomous Okrug, Russia
- Urengoy gas field in Yamalo-Nenets Autonomous Okrug, Russia
- Novy Urengoy, a town in Yamalo-Nenets Autonomous Okrug, Russia
