= Shlykov =

Shlykov (Russian: Шлыков) is a Russian masculine surname, its feminine counterpart is Shlykova. It may refer to

- Tatyana Shlykova (1773–1863), Russian ballerina and opera singer
- Vitaly Shlykov (1934–2011), Soviet GRU intelligence officer
