= Altai gas pipeline =

Proposed natural gas pipeline between Russia and China

Power of Siberia 2
- Map of the first and second Power of Siberia pipelines, with the proposed Altai and Mongolian routes on the left

Location
- Country: Russia, China
- Direction: north–south
- Start: Purpeyskaya compressor station (Urengoy-Surgut-Chelyabinsk pipeline), Russia
- Passes through: Alexandrovskoye, Vertikos, Parabel, Chazhemto, Volodino, Boyarka, Novosibirsk, Barnaul, Biysk, the Kanas mountain pass
- To: Xinjiang region (West–East Gas Pipeline), China
- Runs alongside: Urengoy–Surgut–Chelyabinsk, Northern Tyumen regions–Surgut–Omsk, Nizhnevartovsk gas refinery–Parabel, Parabel–Kuzbass, Novosibirsk–Kuzbass, Novosibirsk–Barnaul, Barnaul–Biysk pipelines

General information
- Type: natural gas
- Partners: Gazprom
- Operator: TomskTransGaz

Technical information
- Length: 2,800 km (1,700 mi)
- Maximum discharge: 50 billion cubic meters per year

The Power of Siberia 2 (also known as Altai gas pipeline) is a proposed natural gas pipeline to export natural gas from Russia's Western Siberia Altai region to North-Eastern China.

== History ==
The memorandum on deliveries of Russian natural gas to China was signed by Gazprom CEO Alexei Miller and CNPC CEO Chen Geng during Russian president Vladimir Putin's visit to China in March 2006. The project was put on hold in 2009 due to disagreements over natural gas price and competition from other gas sources in the Chinese market.

In 2013, Gazprom and CNPC agreed instead to pursue a route further east, the Power of Siberia gas pipeline. In 2014, the project was resumed during the APEC summit. In 2015, the project was "postponed for an indefinite period of time".

Gazprom and the Mongolian Government discussed details of a feasibility study for the Power of Siberia 2 pipeline project in October 2021. In 2022, Mongolia's prime minister Oyun-Erdene Luvsannamsrai announced that the feasibility study had been completed, and that the construction of the pipeline would commence in 2024, and would connect the Siberian gas fields to China via Mongolia.

On August 19, 2024, the South China Morning Post reported that Mongolia has not included the pipeline in its action programme through 2028.

After Putin's visit in Beijing in September 2025, Russian media announced a "breakthrough" memorandum on continuation of the project.

== Route ==
The 2,800-kilometre (1,700 mi) pipeline would start from the Purpeyskaya compressor station of the existing Urengoy–Surgut–Chelyabinsk pipeline. It would carry natural gas from the Nadym and Urengoy fields in Western Siberia. The total length of the Russian section would be 2,666 kilometres (1,657 mi), including 205 kilometres (127 mi) in Yamalo-Nenets autonomous region, 325 kilometres (202 mi) in Khanty–Mansi autonomous region, 879 kilometres (546 mi) in Tomsk Oblast, 244 kilometres (152 mi) in Novosibirsk Oblast, 422 kilometres (262 mi) in Altai Krai, and 591 kilometres (367 mi) in the Altai Republic. The terminal point in the Russian territory is the Kanas mountain pass. A large part of the pipeline will be built within the technical corridor of existing pipelines, such as the Urengoy—Surgut—Chelyabinsk, Northern Tyumen–Surgut—Omsk, Nizhnevartovsk gas refinery – Parabel, Parabel—Kuzbass, Novosibirsk—Kuzbass, Novosibirsk—Barnaul, and Barnaul—Biysk pipelines. In China, the pipeline would be terminated in the Xinjiang region, where it will be linked to the West–East Gas Pipeline.

Alternatively, an eastern route through Mongolia is being studied. The trans-Mongolian gas pipeline proposal could generate $1 billion in transit fees per year for Mongolia.

== Technical description ==
The diameter of the pipeline would be 1,420 millimetres (56 in). The designed capacity of the pipeline would be 30 billion cubic meters (bcm) natural gas annually and the total costs of the whole project is expected to be up to US$14 billion. The pipeline was originally expected to become operational in 2011. The pipeline will be built and operated by TomskTransGaz, the subsidiary of Gazprom.

== Controversy ==
The pipeline project has been criticized by environmental organizations because it was planned to run across the Ukok Plateau, which is the natural habitat of the snow leopard and other endangered species. Additionally, Altai leaders feared that construction of the pipeline and accompanying technical highway will pave the way for a Chinese expansion into Altai. The pipeline route impacts burial sites and shrines in the region. A price precedent for the Power of Siberia 2 has already been established by the Power of Siberia which is lower than the prices of Central Asian countries and China is the monopsonist buyer.
