= Urengoy–Pomary–Uzhhorod pipeline =

Russia-Ukraine gas transporter

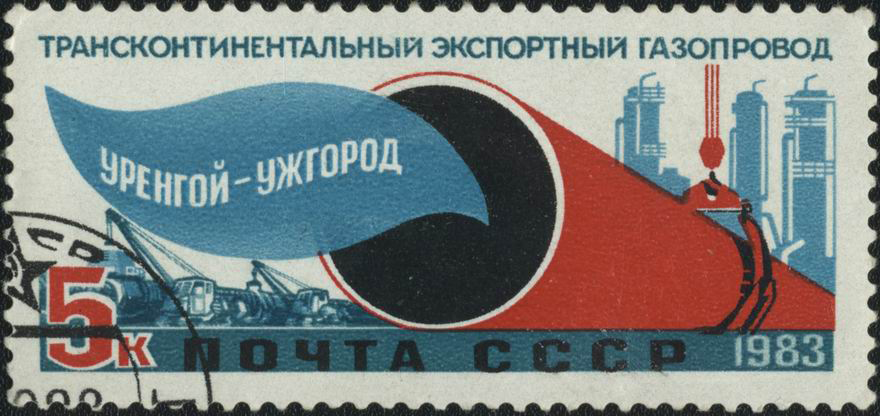
- A Soviet stamp of 1983, dedicated to the Urengoy-Uzhhorod transcontinental export pipeline

Location
- Country: Russia and Ukraine
- Direction: North-South-West
- Start: Urengoy gas field
- Passes through: Izhevsk, Yelets, Kursk, Romny, Zhmerynka, Bohorodchany, Ivano-Frankivsk
- To: Uzhhorod
- Runs alongside: Progress pipeline; Soyuz pipeline

General information
- Type: natural gas
- Operator: Gazprom; UkrTransGaz
- Commissioned: 1984

Technical information
- Length: 4,500 km (2,800 mi)
- Maximum discharge: 32×10^{9} m^{3} (1.1×10^{12} cu ft) per year

The Urengoy–Pomary–Uzhhorod pipeline (also known as the Bratstvo pipeline, Brotherhood pipeline, West-Siberian Pipeline, or Trans-Siberian Pipeline) was one of Russia's main natural gas export pipelines, partially owned and operated by Ukraine. It was part of the "gas in exchange for pipes program", and the Soviet-controlled bank "Ost-West Handelsbank" was opened in Frankfurt on 1 March 1973 to support the project. Russia stopped exporting through this pipeline at the end of 2024 as Ukraine did not renew the contract.

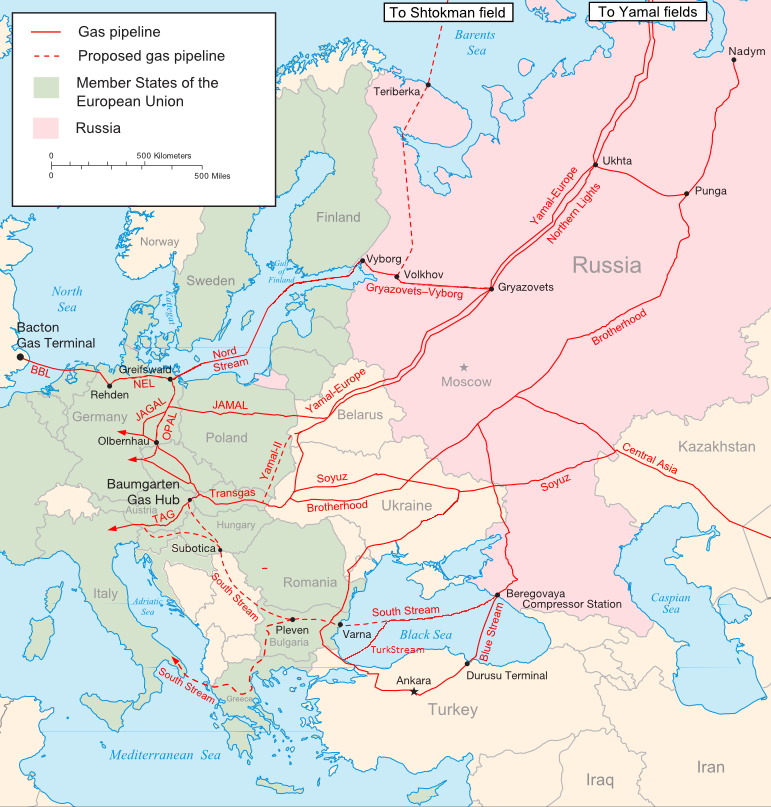
Major Russian gas pipelines to Europe (2021)

== History ==
The pipeline project was proposed in 1978 as an export pipeline from Yamburg gas field, but was later changed to the pipeline from Urengoy field, which was already in use. In July 1981, a consortium of German banks, led by Deutsche Bank, and the AKA Ausfuhrkredit GmbH agreed to provide 3.4 billion Deutsche Mark in credits for the compressor stations. Later finance agreements were negotiated with a group of French banks and the Japan Export-Import Bank (JEXIM). In 1981-1982, contracts were signed with compressors and pipes suppliers Creusot-Loire, John Brown Engineering, Nuovo Pignone, AEG-Telefunken, Mannesmann, Dresser Industries, and Japan Steel Works. Pipe-layers were bought from Komatsu.

The pipeline was constructed in 1982-1984. It complemented the Western Siberia-Western Europe transcontinental gas transportation system which had existed since 1973. The official inauguration ceremony took place in France.

On 19 July 2011, UkrTransGaz started modernization of the pipeline.

In the Russo-Ukrainian War, on 7-8 March 2025, during a counterattack on Ukrainian-held positions in Kursk Oblast, Russian assault groups used the pipeline to infiltrate Ukrainian positions in Sudzha. Meduza reported that the Veterans formation, Akhmat special forces and the 30th Motorized Rifle Regiment were involved. The Veterans formation made earlier use of tunnel warfare in the Battle of Avdiivka. According to pro-Russian bloggers, up to 100 Russian troops crawled nearly 16 kilometers in the narrow pipe for two days, then waiting four days for the attack. According to Valery Gerasimov, the operation, named Potok (Operation Stream), involved more than 600 soldiers. Ukraine acknowledged the presence of those troops, yet said that they were detected and engaged.

On 18 March a small gas fire was reported on the Gas Metering Station "Sudzha" located on the Russian side of the Ukraine-Russia border, and then on 20 March a massive gas explosion and fire were reported. The station at the time of the fire is controlled by Armed Forces of Ukraine.

== Route ==
The pipeline runs from Siberia's Urengoy gas field via a compressor plant at Pomar in Mari El to Uzhhorod in Western Ukraine. From there, the natural gas is transported to Central and Western European countries. Together with the Soyuz (Orenburg–Western border) pipeline and Progres (Yamburg–Western border) pipeline it forms the western transit corridor in Ukraine. It passes through a hub at Sudzha, Kursk Oblast then crosses the Russian–Ukrainian border north of Sumy. In Ukraine, it takes gas to the Uzhhorod pumping station on the Ukrainian border with Slovakia and to smaller pumping stations on the Hungarian and Romanian borders. The pipeline crosses the Ural, the Carpathian mountains and more than 600 rivers including Ob, Volga, Don and Dnieper rivers.

== Technical features ==
The pipeline is 4,500 kilometres (2,800 mi) long, of which 1,160 kilometres (720 mi) is in Ukraine. Its diameter is 56 inches (1,420 mm). The original annual capacity of the pipeline was 32 billion cubic metres (1.1 trillion cubic feet) of natural gas per year. By 2009, the factual annual capacity was 27.9 billion cubic metres (990 billion cubic feet). It has 42 compressor stations, of which nine are in Ukraine.

The telecommunications and cathodic protection systems of the pipeline were installed by Alcatel of France. The pipeline utilizes 85 dual CCTV stations for telecommunications.

== Operators ==
The Russian section of this pipeline is operated by Gazprom and the Ukrainian section is operated by UkrTransGaz. On 1 June 2022, 41.2 million cubic meters were transmitted through Ukraine.

== Controversies ==
=== Disagreement among the allies ===
Soviet plans to build the pipeline were strongly opposed by the US-administration of Ronald Reagan. Americans were afraid that Western Europe would become dependent on the Soviet gas supplies, giving leverage to the Soviet Union. They also feared the Kremlin would use the export revenue for military purposes. In December 1981, the US implemented sanctions preventing American companies from exporting oil and gas technologies to the Soviet Union. In June 1982, these sanctions were expanded to cover subsidiaries of US companies in Europe.

Washington's Western European allies, however, refused to boycott the pipeline. The foreign ministers of the European Economic Community called extension of the American sanctions illegal and sent a formal note of protest. From the European perspective, participation in the pipeline project was seen as an opportunity for the depressed steel and engineering industry in Europe and as a way to diversify from the OPEC oil supplies. Western European governments insisted that contracts already signed between the Soviets and European companies needed to be honored. This led to several European companies being sanctioned by the US. Reagan reportedly said: "Well, they can have their damned pipeline. But not with American equipment and not with American technology." The efforts by the US to prevent the construction of the pipeline, and its export embargo of supplies needed to build it (1980–84), constituted one of the most severe transatlantic crises of the Cold War.

=== Forced labor ===
The construction of the pipeline was also subject to a United States Congressional hearing investigating the use of imported Vietnamese labor from re-education camps to build the pipeline.

== Accidents ==
The pipeline's first accident occurred even before the project began. On 15 December 1983, a fire broke out at a compressor station in Urengoy, destroying electronic monitoring devices and control panels, but no one was injured.

On 7 May 2007, the pipeline exploded near the village of Luka, then in Tarashcha Raion of Kyiv Oblast, damaging a 30 metres (98 ft) section. Another explosion happened on 6 December 2007 near the village of Tiahun.

A terrorist explosion damaged the pipeline in Rozhniativ district in Ivano-Frankivsk Oblast in May 2014. According to the Russian government owned radio station Voice of Russia terrorist threats against the pipeline were made by Right Sector leader Dmytro Yarosh in March 2014. Another section of the pipeline exploded in the Poltava region on June 17, 2014, one day after Russia limited the supply of gas to Ukrainian customers due to non-payment. Ukraine's Interior Minister Arsen Avakov said the next day, that the explosion had been caused by a bomb.

An explosion on part of the pipeline in the Russian region of Chuvashia during maintenance work was reported on December 20, 2022; three people were reported to have been killed.

== In popular culture ==
The 1987 James Bond film The Living Daylights uses an inspection gadget in the pipeline as a plot device to smuggle a KGB defector to the West.

In 1987, Antony Blinken's college thesis was published as his first book about that episode in Cold War history: Ally Versus Ally: America, Europe, and the Siberian Pipeline Crisis.

== Books ==
- Antony J. Blinken (1987). Ally versus Ally: America, Europe, and the Siberian Pipeline Crisis. New York: Praeger. ISBN 0-275-92410-6

== See also ==
- Yamal-Europe pipeline
- Natural gas transmission system of Ukraine
