= Vasily Podshibyakin =

- Born: Vasily Tikhonovich Podshibyakin; 1 January 1928; Nikitskoye village, Volovsky District, Tula Oblast, Tula Governorate, RSFSR, Soviet Union
- Died: 20 May 1997 (aged 69); Novy Urengoy, Yamalo-Nenets Autonomous Okrug, Russia
- Occupation: Geologist
- Awards: Hero of Socialist Labour

Vasily Tikhonovich Podshibyakin (Russian: Василий Тихонович Подшибякин; 1 January 1928 – 20 May 1997) was a Soviet geologist and head of the trust “Yamalnefterazvedka”. He took part in discoveries of large and unique gas fields in the northern regions of Western Siberia, including Urengoy gas field.

== Biography ==
Podshibyakin was born in Nikitskoye village in Tula Governorate. His grandfather was a batman of Nicholas II; his father – Tikhon Afanasyevich – was one of the first kolkhoz presidents. There were four children in the family besides Vasily.

From 1943 to 1945 he studied at vocational school №8 of Uzlovaya town to get profession of a machinist. In 1951 Podshibyakin entered Moscow Oil University.

After completing his dissertation, Vasily asked to be assigned to Siberia. He became a mining engineer, and then he worked in the north of Tyumen Oblast in Narym and Berezovo. Podshibyakin started as an assistant of a drilling foreman. In 1956 he was appointed the main engineer of Narym oil-exploring, in 1958 he became the director of that detachment.

In 1959 the Narym expedition was transferred to Tyumen Oblast to Middle Ob side. Podshibyakin headed the Nizhnevartovsk group of the Surgut complex expedition.

In 1963 Vasily Posdshibyakin became the director of Tazovskaya oil-exploring expedition, since 1967 he was the oil and gas manager of Yamalo-Nenets geological trust.

With his collaboration the Igrimsk and Shuchtungorsk groups of gas fields were drilled during prospecting of Tazovskoe and Urengoy deposits. Under his direction 36 gas fields in Yamal-Nenetz region were opened including the Zapolyarnoye, Tambeiskoye, Medveshye, Yamburg, Novoportovskoe and Urengoy.

In 1971, after the liquidation of the trust, he was appointed the post of director of Urengoy oil and gas prospecting expedition. In 1976 Podshibyakin was the director of Yamal production geological association “Yamalneftegeologiya”. He was permanent leader of that union until 1997.

He was elected the deputy of State Duma of Yamalo-Nenets Autonomous Okrug.

Podshibyakin died on 20 May 1997 and was buried in Thervishevskoe graveyard near Raul–Yuri Ervier.

== Memory ==
On October 15, 2005 a monument, dedicated to Vasily Podshibyakin, was opened in Salekhard. A street and a microregion of this city were named after him.

== Awards and honors ==
- Hero of Socialist Labour (1983)
- Order of Lenin (1983)
- Two Orders of the Red Banner of Labour (1966, 1979)
- Lenin Prize (1970)
- Honored Geologist of the Russian Federation (1997)
