= Farewell Dossier =

Early 1980s Soviet leak of classified documents

The Farewell Dossier was the collection of documents that Colonel Vladimir Vetrov, a KGB defector "en place" (code-named "Farewell"), gathered and gave to the Direction de la surveillance du territoire (DST) in 1981–82, during the Cold War.

Vetrov was an engineer who had been assigned to evaluate information on NATO hardware and software gathered by the "Line X" technical intelligence operation for Directorate T, the Soviet Union directorate for scientific and technical intelligence collection from the West. He became increasingly disillusioned with the Soviet system and decided to work with the French at the end of the 1970s. Between early 1981 and early 1982, Vetrov gave almost 4,000 secret documents to the DST, including the complete list of 250 Line X officers stationed under legal cover in embassies around the world.

As a consequence, Western nations undertook a mass expulsion of Soviet technology spies.

Vetrov's story inspired the 1997 book Bonjour Farewell : La Vérité sur la Taupe Française du KGB by Sergueï Kostine. It was adapted in the French film L'affaire Farewell (2009) starring Emir Kusturica and Guillaume Canet.

== Background ==
Vetrov was a 52-year-old engineer assigned to evaluate the intelligence on capitalist hardware and software collected by spies ("Line X") for Directorate T. He became disillusioned, and at the end of 1980 volunteered his services to France for ideological reasons. French intelligence gave him the codename "Farewell" — an English word so that the KGB would assume he worked for the CIA if they learned of the code-name.

Between early 1981 and early 1982, Farewell supplied the DST with about four thousand secret documents, including a list of Soviet organizations in scientific collection and summary reports from Directorate T on the goals, achievements, and unfulfilled objectives of the program. He revealed the names of more than 200 Line X officers stationed in 10 KGB residences in the West, along with more than 100 leads to Line X recruitments.

In a private meeting on 19 July 1981, at the Ottawa Summit, French president François Mitterrand made President Ronald Reagan aware of Farewell and offered the intelligence to the United States.

William Safire said Mitterrand described the man as belonging to a section that was evaluating the achievements of Soviet efforts to acquire NATO technology. Reagan expressed great interest in Mitterrand's revelations and thanked him for having the material sent to the United States government. It was passed through Vice President Bush and then to William Casey, his Director of Central Intelligence. Casey called in Gus W. Weiss, then working with Thomas C. Reed on the staff of the National Security Council. After studying the list of hundreds of Soviet agents and purchasers (including one cosmonaut) assigned to this penetration in the US and Japan, Weiss counselled against deportation.

The dossier, under the name of Farewell, reached the CIA in August 1981. It demonstrated that the Soviets had spent years carrying out their espionage of research and development activities.

== CIA response ==
While Vetrov was recruited by the French, the Western counter-reaction came from the US.

Safire was writing a series of hardline columns denouncing the financial backing being given to Moscow by Germany and Britain for the Trans-Siberian Pipeline, a major natural gas pipeline from Siberia to Europe. That project would give control of European energy supplies to the Communists, as well as generate US$8 billion a year to support Soviet computer and satellite research.

Intelligence shortcomings, as we see, have a thousand fathers; secret intelligence triumphs are orphans. Here is the unremarked story of "the Farewell dossier": how a CIA campaign of computer sabotage resulting in a huge explosion in Siberia — all engineered by a mild-mannered economist named Gus Weiss — helped us win the Cold War.

Weiss worked down the hall from me [Safire] in the Nixon administration. In early 1974, he wrote a report on Soviet advances in technology through purchasing and copying that led the beleaguered president — détente notwithstanding — to place restrictions on the export of computers and software to the U.S.S.R.

— William Safire

The CIA mounted a counter-intelligence operation that transferred modified hardware and software designs over to the Soviets. They instigated an operation of disinformation and faulty technology transfer. Thomas C. Reed alleged this was the cause of a trans-Siberian pipeline disaster in 1982. (Note: These allegations are contained in the 2004 book At the Abyss: An Insider's History of the Cold War. Critics have contested the authenticity of the account.)

Information from Vetrov also led to the arrest in New York of the spy Dieter Gerhardt, a South African naval officer who had been passing secrets to the Soviets for 20 years. His handler, Vitaly Shlykov, was arrested and subsequently imprisoned in Switzerland while attempting to meet with Gerhardt's wife, Ruth, who was acting as his courier.

=== Counterintelligence response ===
According to Reed, another result was that the United States and its NATO allies later "rolled up the entire Line X collection network, both in the US and overseas." Weiss said "the heart of Soviet technology collection crumbled and would not recover".

== Discovery ==
Eventually, Vetrov's defection led to his death. "Vetrov fell into a tragic episode with a woman and a fellow KGB officer in a Moscow park. In circumstances that are not clear, he stabbed and killed the officer and then stabbed but did not kill the woman. He was arrested, and, in the ensuing investigation, his espionage activities were discovered; he was eventually executed in 1985. CIA had enough intelligence to institute protective countermeasures."

By 1985 Mitterrand came to suspect that Vetrov had been a CIA plant set up to test him after his election in 1981 to see if the material would be handed over to the Americans or kept by the French. Acting on this mistaken belief, Mitterrand fired the chief of the French service, Yves Bonnet. The details of the operation were declassified in 1996.

== Reception ==
First Secretary of the Communist Party of Cuba Fidel Castro wrote in a 2007 article that the campaign of countermeasures based on Farewell's dossier was an economic war; that although there were no deaths in the gas pipeline explosion, the Soviet economy was significantly damaged; and that between 1984 and 1985, the United States and its NATO allies had put an end to the technology spying operation, which had destroyed the capacity of the USSR to capture technology when Moscow was caught between a defective economy on one hand and a US President determined to prevail and end the Cold War on the other.
