= At the Abyss =

2004 autobiography by Thomas C. Reed

At the Abyss: An Insider's History of the Cold War
- Author: Thomas C. Reed
- Genre: Autobiography
- Publication date: 2004
- ISBN: 0-89141-821-0

At the Abyss: An Insider's History of the Cold War (ISBN 0-89141-821-0) is a 2004 autobiographical book about Thomas C. Reed's experience at Lawrence Livermore National Laboratory through his time as an advisor to President Ronald Reagan. It reveals new details about the 1962 Cuban Missile Crisis, the Central Intelligence Agency, the Farewell Dossier, and other facets of the Cold War.

== Trans-Siberian gas pipeline sabotage allegation ==
In the book, Reed stated the United States added a Trojan horse to gas pipeline control software that the Soviet Union obtained from a company in Canada. According to Reed, when the components were deployed on a Trans-Siberian gas pipeline, the Trojan horse led to a huge explosion. He wrote: "The pipeline software that was to run the pumps, turbines and valves was programmed to go haywire, to reset pump speeds and valve settings to produce pressures far beyond those acceptable to the pipeline joints and welds. The result was the most monumental non-nuclear explosion and fire ever seen from space."

A report in the Moscow Times quoted KGB veteran Vasily Pchelintsev as saying that there was a natural gas pipeline explosion in 1982, but it was near Tobolsk on a pipeline connecting the Urengoy gas field to the city of Chelyabinsk, and it was caused by poor construction rather than sabotage; according to Pchelintsev's account, no one was killed in the explosion and the damage was repaired within one day. Reed's account has also not been corroborated by intelligence agencies in the United States, although in 1996 the CIA did publish that "flawed turbines were installed on a gas pipe line" in their historical recounting of the Farewell Dossier.

Another point of criticism of the sabotage allegations is that, according to Prof. V. D. Zakhmatov, an explosion safety expert who has overseen the safety measures on many of the Soviet oil and gas pipelines built in the 1980s, at the described timeframe Soviet Union simply didn't practice digital control of its pipeline system. Most of the control was manual, and whatever automation was used utilized the analog control systems, most of which worked through pneumatics.

== Critical reception ==
According to a review in Publishers Weekly: "The writing is sometimes discursive if seldom dull, and some areas have already been adequately covered by others. But the book deserves quite high marks for how much it pulls together, as well as offering a viewpoint on the Cold War not nearly sufficiently well-represented in the public literature: that neither the U.S. nor Soviet sciences were dominated by stereotypical, bomb-happy maniacs."
