= Orenburg (disambiguation) =

Orenburg is a city in Russia.

Orenburg may also refer to:

- Orenburg Oblast (est. 1934), a federal subject of Russia
- Orenburg Governorate (1744–1782 and 1796–1928), an administrative division of the Russian Empire and the early Russian SFSR
- Orenburg (air base), a military transport aviation base in Orenburg Oblast, Russia
- Orenburg gas field, a natural gas field in Orenburg Oblast, Russia
- Orenburg Airlines, alternative name of Orenair, an airline based in Orenburg, Russia
- 27709 Orenburg, a main-belt asteroid
- FC Orenburg, a football club based in Orenburg, Russia
