= Gus W. Weiss =

American foreign policy adviser

Gus W. Weiss was a White House policy adviser on technology, intelligence and economic affairs who worked primarily on national security, intelligence and concerns on technology transfers to communist countries.

== Education ==
Weiss graduated from Vanderbilt University in Nashville. He received his MBA from Harvard University and taught at NYU where he also received a PhD in economics.

== Career ==
- Under Presidents Nixon, Ford and Reagan, Weiss served as a foreign affairs officer and on the U.S. National Security Council.
- Under President Carter, he was an assistant to the Secretary of Defense (Space Policy), a member of the Pentagon Defense Science Board and also of the US Intelligence Board.

== The Farewell Dossier ==
Weiss was also one of the people that worked on the Farewell Dossier. The USSR collected western computer and scientific technology through espionage and used it for its own national defense. One of the KGB defectors, Vladimir Vetrov, submitted documents collected by the KGB, and potential target items to the French. French president François Mitterrand then shared them with US President Reagan. Weiss suggested that the US export whatever was on the potential targets list to the USSR, but that these items be modified, meaning sourced from the CIA, the Defense Department and the FBI. The products would look genuine, but fail once the USSR started operating them. One successful notable result was a massive fire near the Urengoi starting point of the Trans-Siberian Pipeline in 1983 that could be seen from space.

== Death ==
Weiss died on November 25, 2003 under what the UK newspaper The Independent has characterized as "mysterious circumstances". His body was found on the walk beneath his upstairs apartment in the Watergate building in Washington, DC. The local medical examiner ruled his death a suicide, according to The Washington Post. The Post obituary, which came twelve days after the fact, was the first local report that Weiss had died. It gave no reason for the suicide determination. The Post published its Weiss obituary six days after his hometown newspaper, the Nashville Tennessean, had reported his death. The Tennessean did not know the cause of death. He was 72 years old.
