= Gas Transmission System Operator of Ukraine =

Ukrainian state-owned gas company

Gas Transmission System Operator of Ukraine, or LLC Gas TSO of Ukraine, is the state-owned company which operates the natural gas transmission system of Ukraine. It is owned by the Ministry of Energy, and is an observer at ENTSO-G.

Transmission system operation was unbundled from Ukrtransgaz in 2019.
