= Xavier Ameil =

French engineer (1923–2021)

- Born: 7 January 1923
- Died: 18 April 2021 (aged 98); Bourgueil, France
- Occupation: Engineer

Xavier Ameil (7 January 1923 – 18 April 2021) was a French engineer. He worked for Thomson-CSF and helped pass information from the anti-Soviet spy Vladimir Vetrov to NATO.

== Biography ==
Ameil and his co-worker at Thomson-CSF helped Vladimir Vetrov pass information on the Soviets to the Direction de la surveillance du territoire. Ameil and Vetrov met five times in 1981. These meetings were quite risky, as Ameil had no connection to the Soviets, unlike his successor who worked at the Embassy of France, Moscow. The information obtained helped the United States start the Strategic Defense Initiative and continue the nuclear arms race. In 1983, Ameil was awarded as an Officer of the Legion of Honour for "services to foreign commerce". While being given his rosette, President François Mitterrand said to him "I know everything that you have done".

In 2009, the film Farewell directed by Christian Carion was released. The character Pierre Froment, played by Guillaume Canet, was loosely based on Ameil.

Xavier Ameil died in Bourgueil on 18 April 2021 at the age of 98.
