= Oleska shale gas deposit =

Gas field in Ukraine

Oleska
- Country: Ukraine
- Region: Lviv Oblast; Ivano-Frankivsk Oblast; Ternopil Oblast
- Offshore/onshore: onshore
- Operator: Chevron Corporation
- Partners: Chevron Corporation; Nadra Oleska

Production
- Current production of gas: 28×10^{6} m^{3}/d 1,000×10^{6} cu ft/d 10×10^{9} m^{3}/a (350×10^{9} cu ft/a)
- Recoverable gas: 1.56×10^{12} m^{3} 53×10^{12} cu ft

The Oleska shale gas deposit is an unconventional gas area in Lviv, Ivano-Frankivsk and Ternopil oblasts in Ukraine. The total proven reserves of the Olesska gas field are around 53 trillion cubic feet (1.5×10^{12} m^{3})(1500 km^{3}) and production is slated to be around 1 billion cubic feet per day (28×10^{6} m^{3}/d). The total exploration investment is expected to be about US$350 million.

In November 2013, the American company Chevron Corporation signed a production sharing agreement (PSA) in conjunction with the Ukrainian government and the special permit holder of the field, Nadra Oleshka to begin production at the field. However, in December 2014, Chevron terminated the agreement. Speculation on to why ranged from declining global energy prices, the not promising results of the shale basin on the Polish side, or that tax reforms for foreign shale gas investment were not enacted by the Ukrainian government. After years of inactivity, in 2025, it was announced that the Ukrainian company Ukrnafta would take over Nadra Oleska and thus transfer the special permit, which gives them the rights to production at the field.

== History ==
In May 2012, the American company Chevron Corporation won a government tender to develop the field. In November 2013, the Ukrainian government, Chevron, and Nadra Oleska (which held the special permit for the field) signed a production sharing agreement for hydrocarbon production at the field. Per the agreement, Chevron planned to invest $350 million USD in the initial exploration phase, and then would invest to fully develop the field at an estimated price of over $10 billion. Projected production was set anywhere from 5 to 10 billion cubic metres of gas per year. Around 80 drilling machines would operate continuously for three to four years to help drill wells.

In December 2014, Chevron terminated the agreement with the Government of Ukraine. The company's country manager, Peter Clark, stated, "We have just terminated that PSA (product sharing agreement). When it was signed, things had to be done, but not all of them got done." Speculation on why the agreement was terminated stated that the decision was mainly made out of a combination of declining global energy prices and relatively poor results from exploratory drilling that had already been done on the Polish side of the shale basin that Oleska sits on. The Daily Telegraph at the time also reported that Chevron's stated reason was that the Ukrainian government had failed to enact tax reforms that was necessary to enable foreign shale gas investment, and that it was not related to the War in the Donbas.

In August 2016, the Ukrainian company NAK Nadra Ukraine announced that it intended to hold a competition to select a new investor for the field to replace Chevron, but no competition was ever held. Ukrgasvydobuvannya also explored the field but stated they would not invest. In December 2023, Ukrnafta's deputy director for field development tried to persuade the board of the company to buy the corporate rights to Nadra Oleska, the permit-holding company, rather than in a direct field purchase. The board deferred the consideration. However, in April 2025, the Cabinet of Ministers of Ukraine agreed to transfer 100% of the rights of Nadra Oleska to Ukrnafta. In May 2025, the special permit to the field was officially transferred to Ukrnafta, following this Ukrnafta announced they would begin the exploration of the field again.

== See also ==
- Energy in Ukraine
- List of countries by natural gas proven reserves
- Natural gas in Ukraine
- Yuzivska gas field – Ukrainian gas field
