= Uzlovaya =

Town in Tula Oblast, Russia

Uzlovaya Узловая
- Town
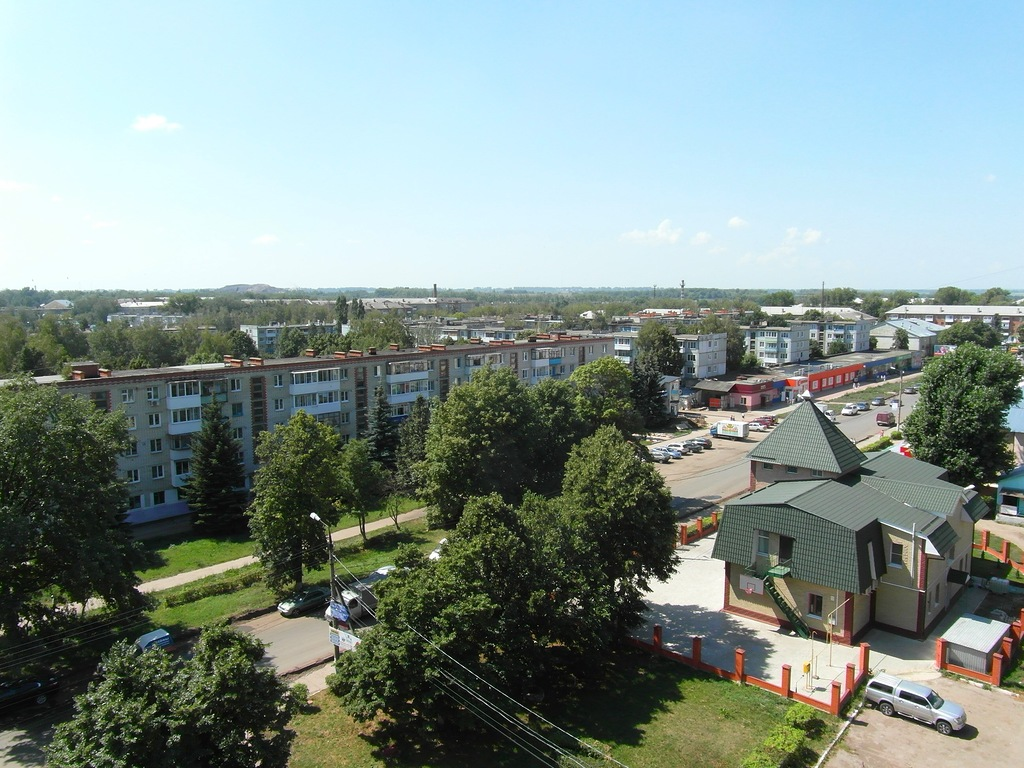
- View of Uzlovaya

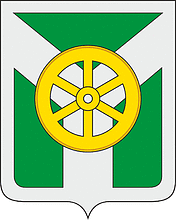
- Flag Coat of arms
- Interactive map of Uzlovaya
- Location of Uzlovaya Uzlovaya (Tula Oblast)
- Coordinates: 53°59′N 38°10′E
- Country: Russia
- Federal subject: Tula Oblast
- Administrative district: Uzlovsky District
- Town under district jurisdictionSelsoviet: Uzlovaya
- Founded: 1873
- Town status since: 1938
- Elevation: 220 m (720 ft)

Population (2010 Census)
  - Total: 55,282
  - Estimate (2025): 47,558 (−14%)

Administrative status
  - Capital of: Uzlovsky District, Uzlovaya Town Under District Jurisdiction

Municipal status
  - Municipal district: Uzlovsky Municipal District
  - Urban settlement: Uzlovaya Urban Settlement
  - Capital of: Uzlovsky Municipal District, Uzlovaya Urban Settlement
- Time zone: UTC+3 (MSK)
- Postal codes: 301600, 301602, 301603, 301605, 301607–301610
- OKTMO ID: 70644101001

Uzlovaya (Russian: Узлова́я) is a town and the administrative center of Uzlovsky District in Tula Oblast, Russia. Population: 55,282 (2010 census); 59,763 (2002 census); 64,889 (1989 Soviet census).

== History ==
It was founded in 1873 as Khrushchyovskaya (Хрущёвская) railway station. It was renamed Uzlovaya in 1877 and granted town status in 1938. The railway influenced much the life and the future of the town.

== Administrative and municipal status ==
Within the framework of administrative divisions, Uzlovaya serves as the administrative center of Uzlovsky District. As an administrative division, it is incorporated within Uzlovsky District as Uzlovaya Town Under District Jurisdiction. As a municipal division, Uzlovaya Town Under District Jurisdiction is incorporated within Uzlovsky Municipal District as Uzlovaya Urban Settlement.

== Economy ==
The station connects three important railway directions: Ryazhsk, Yelets, and Tula. The first coal mines were founded in the late 1930s.

== Notable people ==
- Vasiliy Podshibyakin, geologist
