= Dieter Gerhardt =

South African naval officer and spy (1935–2026)

- Born: Dieter Felix Gerhardt; 1 November 1935; Berlin, Nazi Germany
- Died: 8 July 2026 (aged 90)
- Education: South African Naval College
- Occupations: SA Navy, Commodore, 1956–1983
- Spouse(s): Janet Coggin (m. 1958; div 1966); Ruth Johr (m. 1973)
- Espionage activity
- Allegiance: Soviet Union
- Service branch: Main Intelligence Directorate
- Service years: 1962–1983
- Codename: Felix (Феликс)

Dieter Felix Gerhardt (1 November 1935 – 8 July 2026) was a commodore in the South African Navy and commander of the strategic Simon's Town naval dockyard. He was arrested by the FBI in New York City in 1983 following information obtained from a Soviet defector. He was convicted of high treason as a spy for the Soviets for a period of 20 years in South Africa together with his second wife, Ruth, who had acted as his courier. Both were released prior to the change of government following the 1994 general election.

== Early life and education ==
Gerhardt was born on 1 November 1935, in Berlin, Nazi Germany.

== Military training ==
Gerhardt joined the South African Navy after his father successfully persuaded naval chief Hugo Biermann to take the troubled teenager under his wing to try to instill discipline in him; he graduated from the Naval Academy in Saldanha Bay in 1956, winning the Sword of Honour. In 1962, he attended a Royal Navy mine school in Portsmouth and completed the parachute training course at RAF Abingdon. After his training in Britain, he was seconded to the Royal Navy. He started his spying career in his late twenties, while still a junior naval officer, by offering his services to the South African Communist Party. Bram Fischer referred him to the Soviet embassy in London, where the "walk-in" was recruited into the GRU, the Soviet military intelligence branch, and instructed to continue his career in the South African military.

== Spy activities ==
As part of his service in the Royal Navy, Gerhardt trained at HMS Collingwood and served on HMS Tenby, and passed classified information about the weapons systems there to the Soviets. Among the systems he compromised through these activities were the Seacat and Sea Sparrow missiles. He was also responsible for passing the first intelligence information about the French Exocet missile to the Soviets. British journalist and security services specialist Chapman Pincher maintained that, while in London in the late 1960s, Gerhardt was able to interview Royal Navy Polaris submarine crews for potential candidates that the Soviets could approach. It was also during this time that he met his first wife, British-born Janet Coggin, whom he married in 1958.

Coggin says she became aware of her husband's Cold War spying activities eight years later in 1966, but chose not to turn him in, fearing that he would be executed, leaving her children fatherless. She says Gerhardt eventually gave her an ultimatum to become a spy too, which she declined, forcing the couple's separation. She divorced him in 1966 and moved to Ireland with her children, claiming that she lived in constant fear of the Soviet security services. She subsequently published a book in 1999 about her experiences called The Spy's Wife.

In 1973, Gerhardt married his second wife, Ruth Johr, a Swiss citizen who author Chapman Pincher claims was already a spy for the German Democratic Republic. According to Gerhardt, he recruited her shortly after they were married. She travelled to Moscow to undergo training.

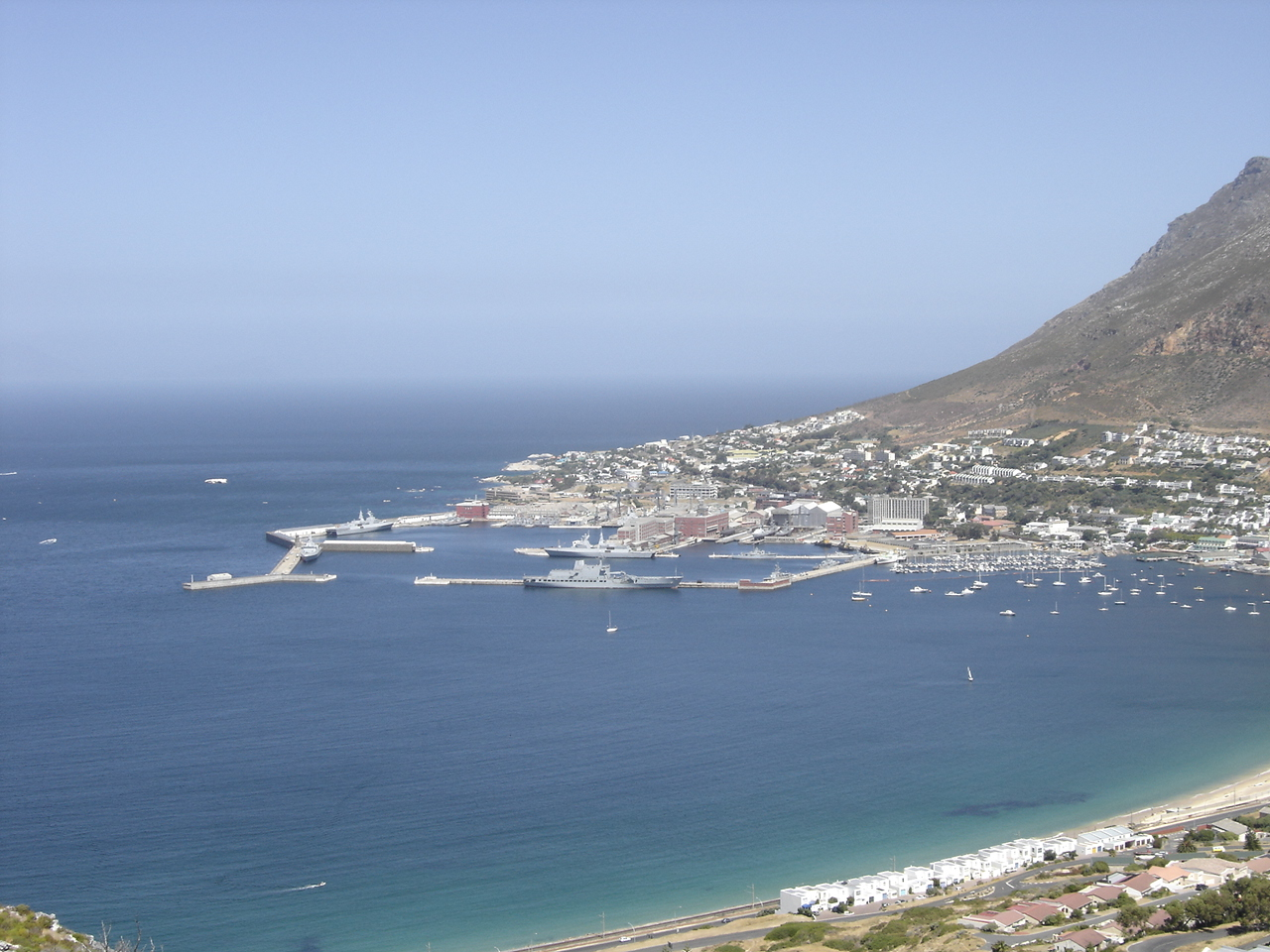
Simon's Town naval base in 2006

Gerhardt rose through the ranks of the naval establishment as his career progressed. Upon his return from training in the United Kingdom in the early 1970s, he served as the naval liaison officer with the defence company that subsequently become Armscor. From 1972 to 1978, he was appointed a senior staff officer to the Chief of the SADF in Pretoria. In this position he was able to access South African Army and Air Force secrets and plans regarding the South African Border War. He claimed direct involvement in aspects of Israeli and South Africa's military cooperation, using this position in 1975 to pass Israeli secrets to the Soviets, including details of the purchase of Jericho missiles from Israel.

Later, Gerhardt was appointed commander of the strategically important Simon's Town naval dockyard. In this position, he had access to all the South African Naval intelligence reports from the Silvermine listening post near Cape Town, as well as technical details of weapons systems. He reportedly revealed to the Soviets most of the Western naval surveillance techniques for the South Atlantic. During the 1982 Falklands War, he was allegedly able to use his position to supply the Soviets with detailed information about the locations of Royal Navy ships in the south Atlantic that the South African Navy intercepted at Silvermine. Admiral of the Fleet Lord Hill-Norton publicly contradicted this view, but supported screening of Royal Navy officers who had been in contact with Gerhardt throughout his career.

Gerhardt visited the USSR five times during his career, while his wife travelled with him twice in 1972 and 1976. He was reportedly paid 800,000 Swiss francs by the GRU for his spying activities; his contact in the GRU said that money was not the motive for Gerhardt.

== Arrest, trial and subsequent release ==
Gerhardt's cover was finally blown by Soviet double agent Vladimir Vetrov (given the codename "Farewell" by France's DST intelligence service) He was arrested at his hotel in New York City in January 1983 in a sting operation by the Federal Bureau of Investigation while he was taking a degree in mathematics at Syracuse University. The CIA interrogated him for 11 days, during which time he gave up one of his Soviet handlers, Vitaly Shlykov (codename "Bob"). Shlykov, who did not know that the Gerhardts had been arrested, was also arrested on 25 January when he travelled to Zürich under the alias "Mikhail Nikolayev" for a pre-arranged meeting with Ruth Gerhardt. He had in his possession $100,000 in cash that he intended to pay her; he did not disclose his real identity to Swiss authorities, and was sentenced to three years imprisonment for spying.

The then Prime Minister of South Africa P. W. Botha announced Gerhardt's arrest to the world in a special press conference on 26 January 1983. Following his deportation to South Africa, Gerhardt and his wife were tried in camera in the Cape Town Supreme Court, with the prospect of a death sentence being handed down for high treason. In his trial, Gerhardt stated that the repulsion he felt towards his father's right-wing political beliefs drove him to fight apartheid by serving the USSR. According to Gerhardt, he deliberately attempted to sow confusion in the trial by stating in his defence that he had spied for an unnamed third country that was not hostile to South Africa. His first wife described him as a "traditional apartheid-accepting South African"; he had told her that he wanted revenge against the South African government for interning his father, a Nazi sympathizer, during World War II. Ruth Gerhardt claimed in her defence that she thought he was a double agent working for South Africa. Judge George Munnik sentenced him to life imprisonment in December 1983, while his wife Ruth received a 10-year sentence for acting as a courier. The judge said that he would have passed the death sentence on Gerhardt that the prosecution sought if the information he had passed to the Soviet Union had led to the death of a South African soldier.

Ruth Gerhardt served her sentence together with Barbara Hogan and other anti-apartheid dissidents. In 1988, she attempted to gain her freedom by renouncing violence, and thereby take advantage of an offer made by P. W. Botha to political prisoners like Nelson Mandela, but the request was turned down by Justice Goldstone.

Dieter Gerhardt was one of the imprisoned spies who was mooted for inclusion in a 1989 East-West prisoner exchange amongst several countries that did not materialise. In 1990 when F. W. de Klerk unbanned organisations such as the ANC and released political prisoners like Nelson Mandela, Gerhardt was not one of those who was freed. He was visited in prison on 22 January 1992 by a delegation from the ANC, who were seeking information regarding the SADF that might have assisted them in CODESA negotiations with the National Party government. Gerhardt was released in August 1992 following his application for release, political pressure in South Africa and an appeal by Russian premier Boris Yeltsin to South African President FW de Klerk when the latter visited Moscow after the dissolution of the Soviet Union. (Note: Gerhardt was not a member of any of the previously banned political organisations such as the ANC. There is some evidence to suggest that other people like Helen Suzman and Nelson Mandela also intervened on his behalf at various points in time.) Former Minister of Defence Magnus Malan said that the former spy's release was a precondition to the restoration of diplomatic ties and the signing of a trade agreement between South Africa and the Russian Federation.

Gerhardt moved to Basel, Switzerland, following in the footsteps of his Swiss wife Ruth Gerhardt, who was released in 1990 following a request from the Swiss government. He stated upon his release that: "I did not feel like a traitor or someone who was betraying his colleagues. I was a political activist fighting the evil regime of apartheid. It was nothing personal." Gerhardt was subsequently granted amnesty in 1999 by the Truth and Reconciliation Commission, and his rank of rear admiral restored.

== Nuclear weapons controversy ==
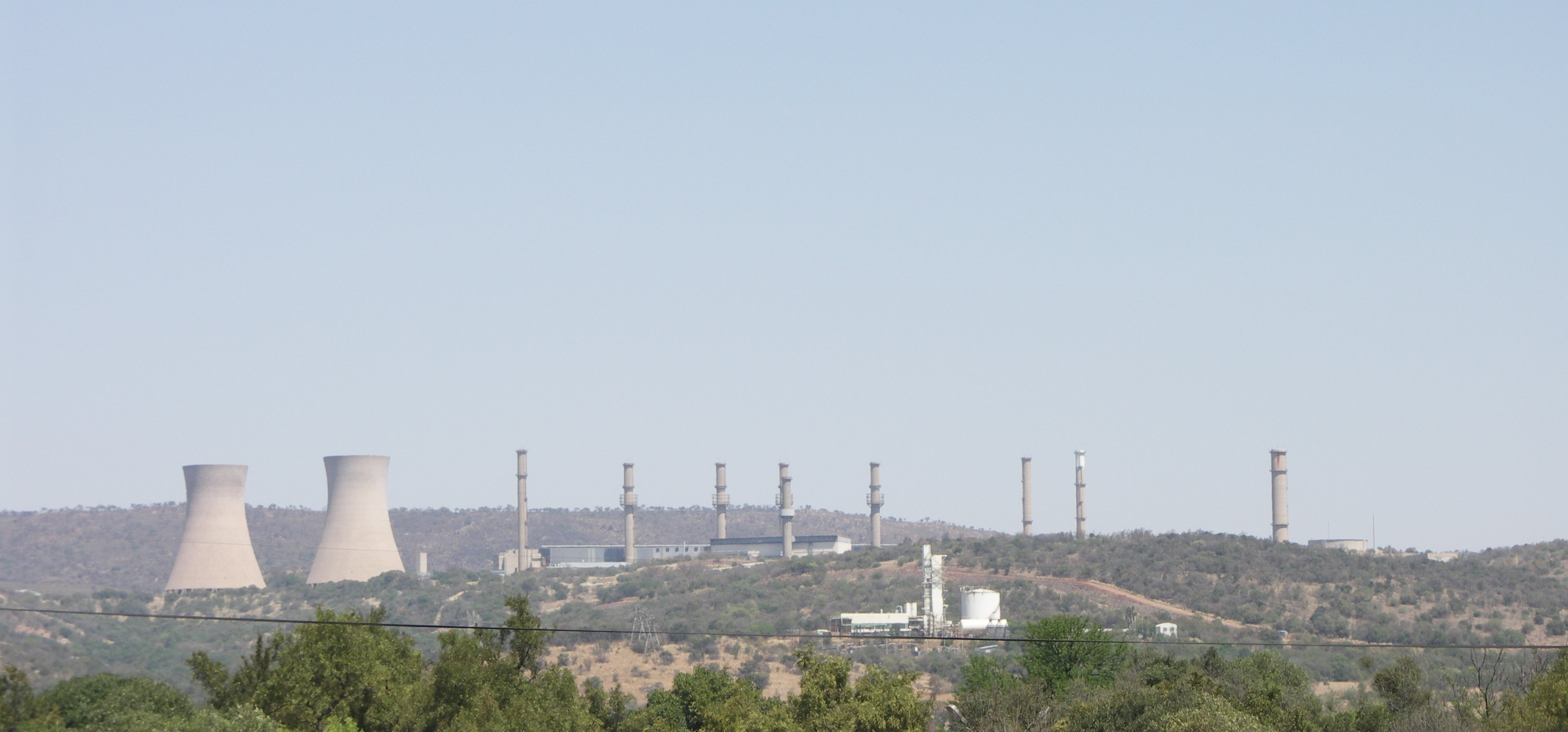
Pelindaba

Gerhardt claimed that the United States and the Soviet Union met in 1976 to discuss South Africa's nuclear weapons programme, and that the Soviets proposed a pre-emptive strike on the Pelindaba plant.

In February 1994, he told Des Blow of the Johannesburg City Press that the Vela incident was the result of a joint Israeli-South African nuclear test, code-named Operation Phoenix. He stated that he had no official knowledge of the alleged test, but was not ready to provide further details. In a subsequent interview with David Albright in March 1994, he stated that no South African warships had been involved, but declined to provide further details.

Popular Mechanics contends that the mystery surrounding the incident would finally have been resolved if Gerhardt were a more credible source, while other authors suggest that newly declassified documents increase the credibility of his claims.

== Death ==
Gerhardt died on 8 July 2026, at the age of 90.

== See also ==
- John Anthony Walker
