= Farewell (2009 film) =

- United States theatrical poster
- Directed by: Christian Carion
- Written by: Christian Carion
- Produced by: Philip Boëffard; Bertrand Faivre; Christophe Rossignon
- Starring: Guillaume Canet; Emir Kusturica; Alexandra Maria Lara; Willem Dafoe; Fred Ward
- Cinematography: Walther Vanden Ende
- Edited by: Andrea Sedlácková
- Music by: Clint Mansell
- Production company: Canal+
- Distributed by: Pathé
- Release dates: September 4, 2009 (Telluride); September 23, 2009 (France)
- Running time: 113 minutes
- Country: France
- Languages: French; Russian; English
- Budget: $21 million
- Box office: $7.4 million

Farewell (French: L'affaire Farewell; literally The Farewell Affair) is a 2009 French espionage thriller film directed by Christian Carion, starring Guillaume Canet and Emir Kusturica. The film is loosely based on the actions of the high-ranking KGB official, Vladimir Vetrov. It was released in the United States in June 2010. It was adapted from the book Bonjour Farewell: La vérité sur la taupe française du KGB (1997) by Serguei Kostine.

The movie was filmed in Ukraine and Finland because Russia refused to provide a permit for filming in Moscow. A Reuters news item also stated that the Russian government "dissuaded Russian movie actor Sergei Makovetsky and Russian producer and director Nikita Mikhalkov from participating in the film" (according to the director).

== Plot ==
In the early 1980s, a high-ranking KGB analyst, Sergei Grigoriev, disillusioned with the Soviet regime, decides to pass Soviet secrets, including a list of their spies, to the government of France, then under the newly elected President François Mitterrand, a Socialist in coalition with the Communist Party. Grigoriev (code-named Farewell by the French intelligence service) hopes to force change in the Soviet Union by revealing their extensive network of spies trying to acquire scientific, technical and industrial information from the West. He uses Pierre Froment, a naïve French engineer based in Moscow, as his unlikely intermediary. After the first transfer of information, Pierre confides in his wife Jessica, who is adamant about his stopping this activity in order to safeguard their family. Grigoriev persuades Pierre to continue without telling Jessica. He will accept neither money nor defection as a reward, but sometimes requests small gifts from Pierre's trips to France, such as a Sony Walkman and Queen cassette tapes for his son, some cognac, or books of French poetry. As Farewell's prodigious output blossoms, the French are bewildered by the sheer scale and yield of top Western technology transferred covertly to the Soviets.

Under suspicion that he is not a trustworthy ally, Mitterrand personally hands U.S. President Ronald Reagan a dossier of invaluable Farewell data during the Ottawa G7 summit. The Americans are astounded with it and other information provided by Farewell, culminating in the full "List X" of Soviet spies within the highest echelons of the Western scientific and industrial apparatus. They embark on an ambitious plan to feed the Soviets erroneous or defective data; shortly afterwards, the network of Soviet technology spies in the West is rolled up, and Reagan announces the "Star Wars" antimissile shield project. Deprived of hi-tech information from the West, and with their own laboratories falling behind, the Soviet leadership panics. Seeing this desperate impasse for what it is, Mikhail Gorbachev, then an upwards-mobile party official, starts preparing the reform policies he is to pursue in the future.

Grigoriev's superior, a double agent for the CIA, is directed by them to sacrifice Grigoriev and save the Froments, all unbeknownst to the French. Grigoriev, under arrest and KGB interrogation, plays dumb to give the Froments time to escape. They cover their tracks and flee by car to the Finnish border. While in West Germany for debriefing, Pierre pleads with the CIA Director to save Grigoriev, praising his integrity and selflessness. The director refuses as a policy principle, having brought the other agent to the West. Grigoriev is granted his request of execution by a marksman on the jetty of the snow-clad lake he loves. Pierre is later offered a company job in Manhattan.

== Cast ==
- Emir Kusturica as Sergei Grigoriev (the character based on Vetrov)
- Guillaume Canet as Pierre Froment, an engineer working in the Moscow branch of French electronics conglomerate Thomson-CSF
- Alexandra Maria Lara as Jessica Froment, Pierre's wife
- Willem Dafoe as Feeney, Director of the Central Intelligence Agency
- Fred Ward as U.S. President Ronald Reagan
- Philippe Magnan as President François Mitterrand of France
- Niels Arestrup as Vallier, Director of the DST
- David Soul as Hutton, aide to President Reagan
- Ingeborga Dapkunaite as Natasha, Grigoriev's wife
- Dina Korzun as Alina, a colleague and mistress that Grigoriev is having an affair with
- Yevgeni Vasilyevich Kharlanov as Igor, the Grigorievs' rebellious son
- Christian Sandström as Federal Bureau of Investigation agent
- Diane Kruger, Benno Fürmann, Gary Lewis and Alex Ferns, amongst others, have cameos.

== Reception ==
On review aggregator Rotten Tomatoes, the film holds an approval rating of 86% based on 77 reviews, with an average rating of 7.06/10. On Metacritic, the film has a weighted average score of 74 out of 100, based on 25 critics, indicating "generally favorable reviews".

== See also ==
- Farewell Dossier
