= Uzlovsky District =

Uzlovsky District Узловский район (Russian)
- District
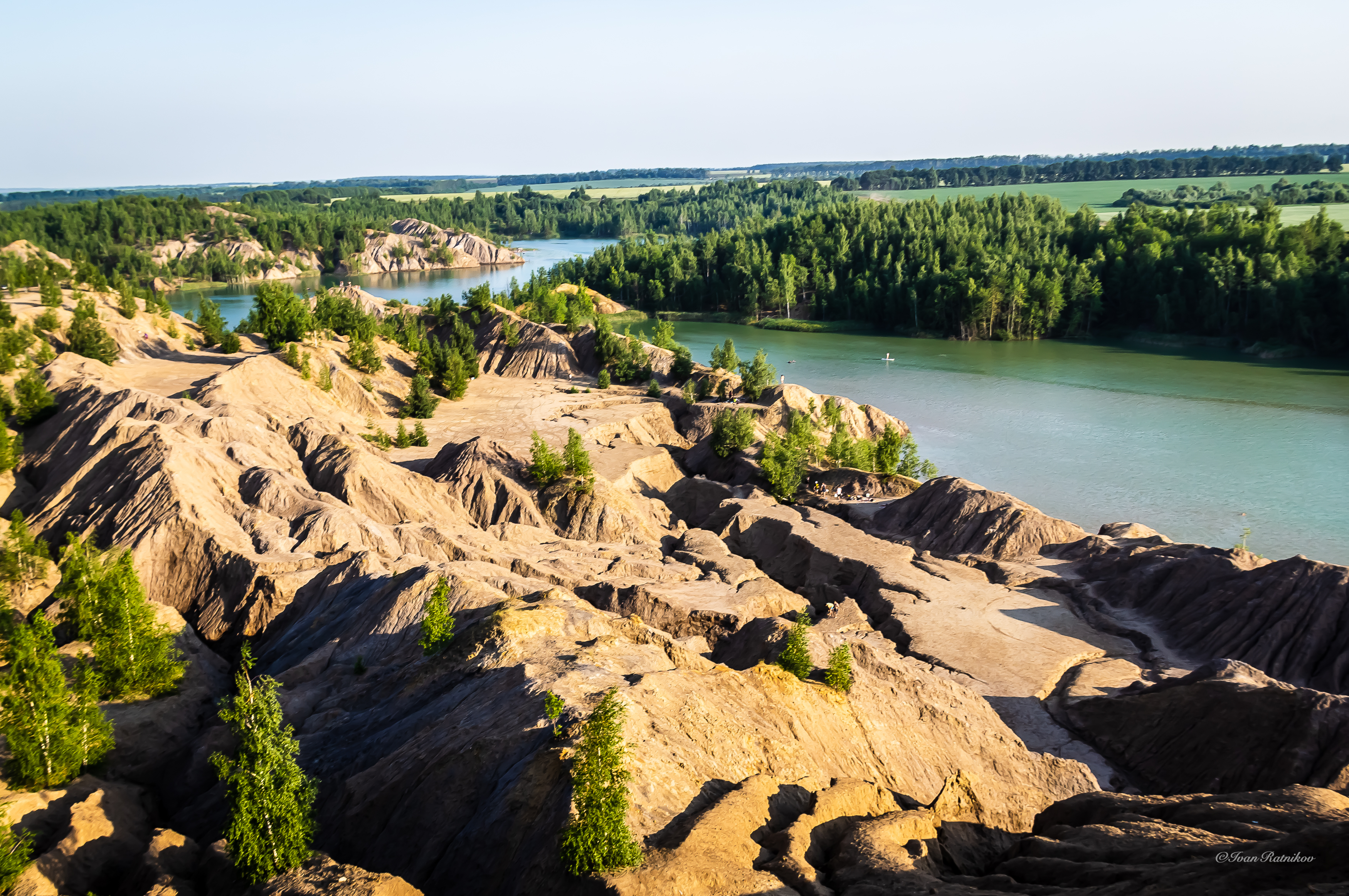

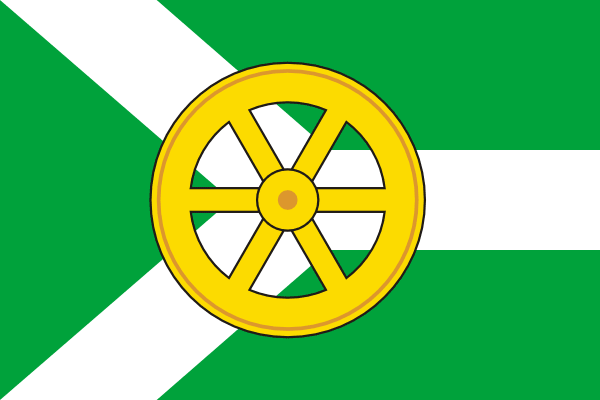
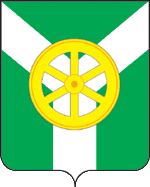
- Flag Coat of arms
- Location of Uzlovsky District in Tula Oblast
- Coordinates: 53°59′N 38°10′E
- Country: Russia
- Federal subject: Tula Oblast
- Established: 1924
- Administrative center: Uzlovaya

Area
  - Total: 567 km^{2} (219 sq mi)

Population (2010 Census)
  - Total: 85,173
  - Density: 150/km^{2} (389/sq mi)
  - Urban: 79.5%
  - Rural: 20.5%

Administrative structure
  - Administrative divisions: 1 Towns under district jurisdiction, 2 Urban-type settlements, 17 Rural administrations
  - Inhabited localities: 1 cities/towns, 2 urban-type settlements, 110 rural localities

Municipal structure
  - Municipally incorporated as: Uzlovsky Municipal District
  - Municipal divisions: 3 urban settlements, 6 rural settlements
- Time zone: UTC+3 (MSK)
- OKTMO ID: 70644000
- Website: http://www.yzlovaya.ru

Uzlovsky District (Russian: Узло́вский райо́н) is an administrative district (raion), one of the twenty-three in Tula Oblast, Russia. Within the framework of municipal divisions, it is incorporated as Uzlovsky Municipal District. It is located in the east of the oblast. The area of the district is 567 square kilometers (219 sq mi). Its administrative center is the town of Uzlovaya. Population: 85,173 (2010 Census); 11,046 (2002 Census); 13,284 (1989 Soviet census). The population of Uzlovaya accounts for 64.9% of the district's total population.
