= Vladimir Vetrov =

Soviet spy (1932–1985)

Vladimir Ippolitovich Vetrov Russian: Владимир Ипполитович Ветров
- Born: Vladimir Ippolitovich Vetrov; 10 October 1932
- Died: 23 January 1985 (aged 52); Moscow, Soviet Union
- Cause of death: Execution
- Espionage activity
- Allegiance: Soviet Union; France
- Service branch: KGB, DST
- Rank: Lieutenant Colonel
- Codename: Farewell
- Operations: Farewell Dossier
- Other work: Double agent

Vladimir Ippolitovich Vetrov (Russian: Владимир Ипполитович Ветров; 10 October 1932 – 23 January 1985) was a high-ranking KGB spy during the Cold War who decided to covertly release valuable information, later known as the Farewell Dossier, to France and NATO on the Soviet Union's clandestine program aimed at stealing technology from the West.

Vetrov was assigned the code-name Farewell by the French intelligence service the Direction de la surveillance du territoire (DST), which recruited him. He was known by that name throughout NATO's intelligence services. The code-name was chosen as an English word, so that the KGB would assume he worked for the CIA if it learned his codename.

Vetrov was executed for treason in the Soviet Union on 23 January 1985. His life inspired a film and books were written about his life and career.

== Biography ==
Vladimir Vetrov was born on 10 October 1932 and grew up within the Soviet Union. After college, where he studied electronic engineering, he was enlisted in the KGB.

He lived in France for five years, beginning in 1965, when posted there as a Line X officer working for the KGB's 'Directorate T', which specialized in obtaining information about advanced science and technology from western countries. While there, he befriended Jacques Prévost, an engineer working with Thomson-CSF. Vetrov returned to Moscow at the end of his posting, with a subsequent posting to Montreal, though Vetrov was recalled prematurely for reasons that are unclear.

There, he rose through the ranks of Directorate T, eventually supervising the evaluation of the intelligence collected by Line X agents around the world, and passing key information to the relevant users inside the Soviet Union. Having become increasingly disillusioned with the Communist system, he decided to pass important state secrets to the west for purely ideological reasons, though he eventually and reluctantly accepted 25,500 rubles (roughly equivalent to four years of his salary). At the end of 1980 or in early 1981, he contacted Prévost, by then working in the Soviet Union, who operated as a liaison to the French DST and offered his services to the West. First contacts were initially made though Xavier Ameil, an engineer working under Prévost. He asked for no payment or any promise of extrication to the West, since his motivation was frustration with the Soviet system, and a personal grudge against his superiors. "This totalitarian order crushes individuals and promotes discord between people", Vetrov wrote.

Between the spring of 1981 and early 1982, Vetrov, code-named FAREWELL, gave the DST almost 4,000 secret documents, including the complete official list of 250 Line X officers stationed under legal cover in embassies around the world, causing a breakdown of the Soviet espionage effort to obtain scientific, industrial and technical information from the West. Members of the GRU, the Soviet Academy of Sciences and several other bodies all took part in such efforts. One report states that information provided by Vetrov "neutralized 422 KGB officers and 54 Western agents (Soviet moles) working for the KGB and the USSR bloc".

The information received by DST allowed France to expel 47 KGB agents from France on 5 April 1983. Arrests were also made, including Pierre Bourdiol, whom he had himself recruited, which was considered a faux pas in the espionage community, as it was considered a violation of protocol to burn one's own recruit.

In February 1982, after heavy drinking caused by a cooling-off period imposed by the French, who were fearful of his discovery through too much contact, Vetrov stabbed his mistress during an argument in his car (she survived). When a man knocked on the car window, Vetrov thought his spying had been discovered, so he stabbed and killed the man. He happened to be an auxiliary policeman, likely looking for a bribe from what he thought were two people having sex in a highway median. Vetrov was arrested, tried, and sentenced to 12 years in jail in the fall of 1982.

While in jail, Vetrov carelessly revealed in letters that he had been involved in "something big" before going to jail. Subsequent to that, portions of the list of Line X agents (in Vetrov's handwriting) were given to partner nations (resulting in further expulsions), one of whom had a mole which passed that portion back to the KGB, which was the "smoking gun" required to confirm their suspicions. The KGB eventually discovered that he was a double agent. As part of his confession, Vetrov wrote a blistering denunciation of the Soviet system, "The Confession of a Traitor". The KGB promised that he would not be executed if he provided a confession; Vetrov did so but was charged with treason, convicted by the Supreme Court of the Soviet Union and executed on 23 January 1985. News of his execution reached France in March 1985.

== Legacy ==
The information which Vetrov provided (400 names) enabled the western countries to expel nearly 150 Soviet technology spies around the world, including the 47 mentioned above, most of whom were from Line X. This caused the collapse of the Soviet's information program at a time when it was particularly crucial. The U.S. created a massive operation to provide the Soviets with faulty data and sabotaged parts for certain technologies, as a consequence of the Farewell Dossier. Vetrov was also responsible for exposing the spy Dieter Gerhardt, a senior officer in the South African Navy who had been spying for the Soviets for 20 years. Vetrov also provided information hinting at a Polish coup d'état (eventually found to be that by Wojciech Jaruzelski), and alleging a link between the Soviet Union and the assassination attempt on Pope John Paul II.

Vetrovs' life inspired the book Bonjour Farewell: La Vérité sur la Taupe Française du KGB (1997) by Sergei Kostin. It was loosely adapted for the French film L'affaire Farewell (2009), starring Emir Kusturica, Guillaume Canet and Alexandra Maria Lara.

Kostin and Eric Raynaud published a more complete and updated account of the Farewell Dossier under the title Adieu Farewell (Laffont, Paris, 2009). This title became available in English for the first time in 2011, some thirty years after the events.

In 2019, France 5 aired Farewell, l'espion qui aimait la France, an episode of La case du siècle.

== See also ==
- Farewell Dossier
- Cold War
