= Yuzivska gas field =

Ukrainian gas field

Yuzivska
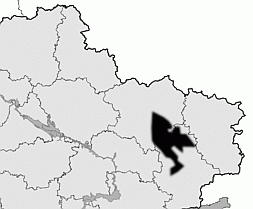
- Map of Yuzivska field within Ukraine
- Country: Ukraine
- Region: Donetsk Oblast; Kharkiv Oblast
- Offshore/onshore: onshore
- Operator: Shell plc

Field history
- Discovery: 2010
- Start of production: 2017

Production
- Current production of gas: 27.4×10^{6} m^{3}/d 960×10^{6} cu ft/d 10×10^{9} m^{3}/a (350×10^{9} cu ft/a)
- Recoverable gas: 2×10^{12} m^{3} 70.766×10^{12} cu ft

The Yuzivska gas field (Ukrainian: Юзівське газове родовище) is an unconventional Ukrainian natural gas field that was discovered in 2010. It was expected to begin production in 2017, but development was halted because of the outbreak of the 2014 war in the Donbas region near the field, a sharp plunge in European natural gas prices (making the costly shale gas development less profitable), and opposition from local residents.

== Background ==
Ukraine's largest natural gas fields are about 80-85% depleted although there are still large quantities of unexploited gas reserves stored in hard-to-reach areas or solid rock, including the Yuzivska gas field.

Since December 2020, the rights to the Yuzivska gas field has been held by the Nadra Yuzivska company, which is owned by Ukraine's state-owned Naftogaz.

== Development ==
As of November 2014, Shell had drilled only two exploration wells and was unable to conduct full exploration of the Yuzivske field due to the situation in Donbas. The company was only able to start some work within Kharkiv region, but continues to work in the region. The initial stage of geological exploration involves obtaining seismic data and drilling up to 15 wells. It is about gas production from hard sandstones.

In July 2016, the Dutch company Yuzgaz B.V. won a tender to attract an investor to implement a production sharing agreement for hydrocarbon production within the Yuzivska area. In December 2018, the Cabinet of Ministers approved the transfer of 90% of Nadra Yuzivska's rights and obligations under the Yuzivska production sharing agreement to Yuzgaz with the project operator represented by the Slovak company Nafta a.s.

== Extraction ==
The Yuzivska block covers an area of 7,886 km^{2}. The total proven reserves of the Yuzivska gas field are around 70.8 trillion cubic feet (2000 billion m^{3}) and production is slated to be around 960 million cubic feet/day (27.4 million m^{3}). Studies indicate that the field would be capable of delivering up to 10 bcm of natural gas annually, which is almost a third of Ukraine's annual natural gas consumption.

The reservoir that holds the gas has low permeability and low porosity (compared to other large natural gas fields in Ukraine) and therefore requires unconventional methods of extraction. The total exploration investment is expected to range between 250 and 300 million USD.

== See also ==
- Energy in Ukraine
- List of countries by natural gas proven reserves
- Natural gas in Ukraine
- Oleska shale gas deposit – Gas field in Ukraine
