= Ukrtransgaz =

Ukrainian energy company (e. 1998)

JSC "Ukrtransgas"
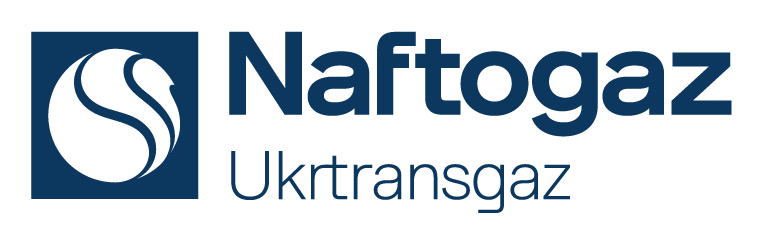

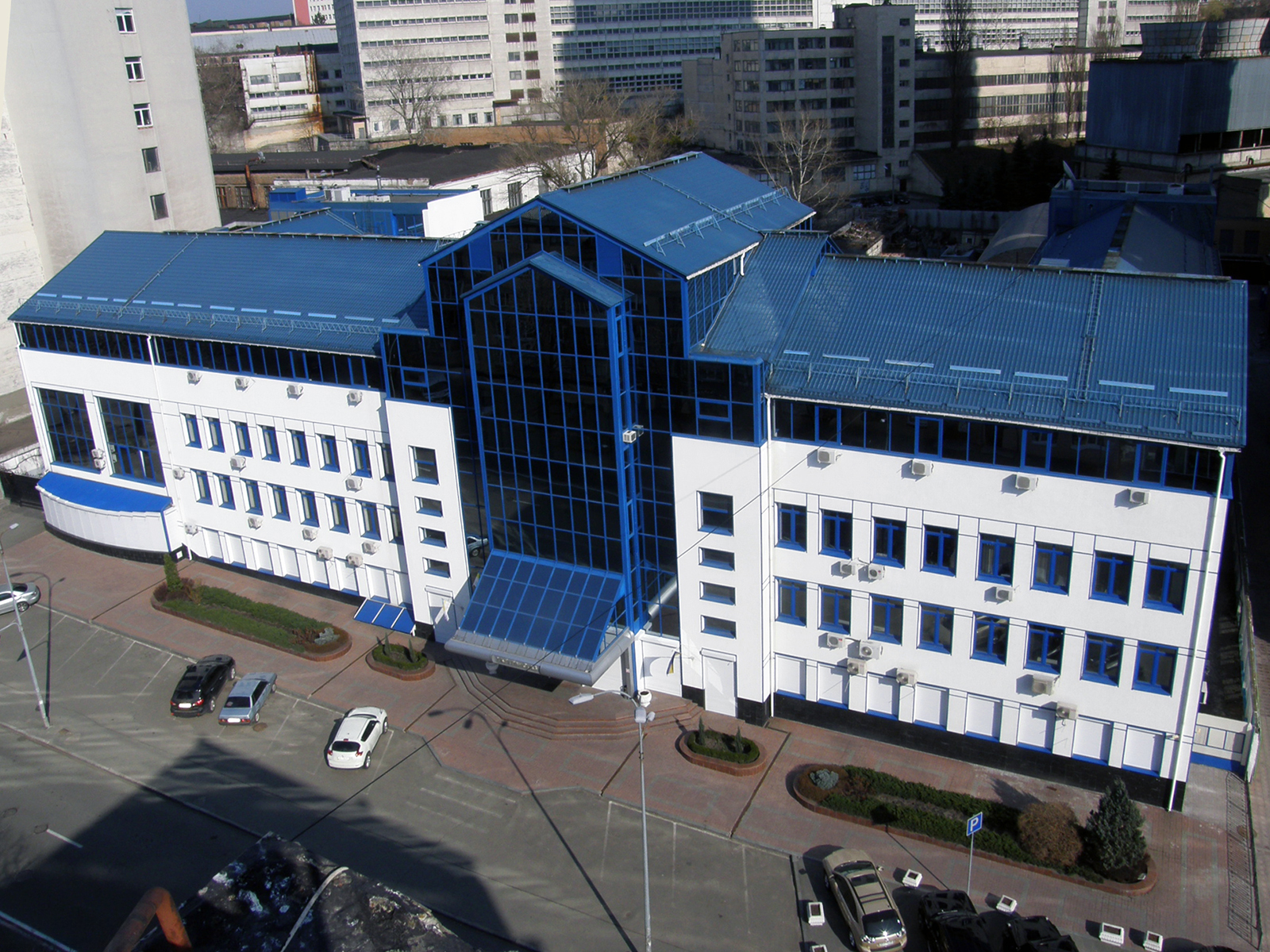
- Headquarters of Ukrtransgaz on Klovskyi Uzviz, Kyiv
- Native name: АТ «Укртрансгаз»
- Company type: Joint-stock company
- Founded: July 24, 1998
- Headquarters: 01021, Ukraine, Kyiv, Klovskyi Uzviz, 9/1
- Products: Natural gas storage. construction, reconstruction, and maintenance of gas industry facilities.
- Revenue: 7,602,302,000 hryvnia (2025)
- Total assets: 74,771,367,000 hryvnia (2025)
- Parent: National JSC 'Naftogaz of Ukraine'
- Website: http://utg.ua

Joint-stock company Ukrtransgas (Ukrainian: Акціонерне товариство "Укртрансгаз") is an independent Storage System Operator of Ukraine that stores gas in Ukraine underground, and carries out retrofit and construction of main gas pipelines and facilities on them. A sole shareholder of Ukrtransgas is National JSC Naftogaz of Ukraine.

== History ==
JSC Ukrtransgaz, a subsidiary of NJSC Naftogaz of Ukraine, was established pursuant to a Cabinet of Ministries of Ukraine Resolution No. 1173 of July 24, 1998, "On unbundling of functions for production, transportation, storage, and sale of natural gas".

Until January 1, 2020, JSC Ukrtransgaz operated in 3 main areas:

- transportation of natural gas via main gas pipelines on the territory of Ukraine and its transit from Russia to European countries;
- natural gas storage;
- maintenance and retrofit of gas transportation facilities.

However, after the unbundling (a reform in Ukraine's gas industry to separate gas transportation activities) had been completed, this function was transferred to LLC GTS Operator of Ukraine. At the same time, JSC Ukrtransgaz started operating as an independent SSO of Ukraine.

On April 7, 2023, the National Energy and Utilities Regulatory Commission (NEURC), following approval from the EU, made a final decision to certify the SSO of Ukraine in accordance with European regulations on the security of gas supply.

"Ukrtransgaz" is the second gas storage operator in Europe that has successfully passed certification and confirmed its right to carry out gas storage activities in accordance with the updated rules in the European Union and the Energy Community.

Certification confirms a right of JSC Ukrtransgaz to store gas not only of Ukrainian companies but also of non-residents. Ukraine has also received an official right to store not only commercial gas reserves of European companies, but also strategic reserves formed at a state level.

== Underground gas storages network ==
The Gas Storage Operator of Ukraine manages 12 underground gas storage facilities with a total capacity of 30.95 billion m^{3}: Bilche-Volitsko-Uherske PSG (17.05 billion m^{3}, the largest gas storage facility in Ukraine and Europe), Uherske (1.9 billion m^{3}), Dashavske (2.15 billion m^{3}), Oparske (1.92 billion m^{3}), Bogorodchanske (2.3 billion m^{3}), Chervonopartizanske (1.5 billion m^{3}), Solokhivske (1.3 billion m^{3}), Olyshivske (0.31 billion m^{3}, is the first underground storage opened on the territory of Ukraine. It was founded in 1964), Proletarske (1 billion m^{3}), Kegychivske (0.7 billion m^{3}), Krasnopopivske (0.42 billion m^{3}), Vergunske (0.4 billion m^{3}, located in the Luhansk region on the temporarily occupied territory and not involved in the company's activities). It is the largest underground gas storage network in Europe and the third largest in the world.

Most Ukraine's UGS were built on depleted gas fields. 2 of them (Brynske and Olyshivske) were opened on aquifers.

80% of the SSO's storage capacities are concentrated near the western border of Ukraine.

== See also ==
- Natural gas transmission system of Ukraine

== Bibliography ==
- Iwaszczuk, N.; Zapukhliak, I.; Iwaszczuk, A.; Dzoba, O.; Romashko, O. Underground Gas Storage Facilities in Ukraine: Current State and Future Prospects. Energies 2022,15, 6604. https://doi.org/10.3390/enl5186604
