= Tatyana Shlykova =

Russian opera singer

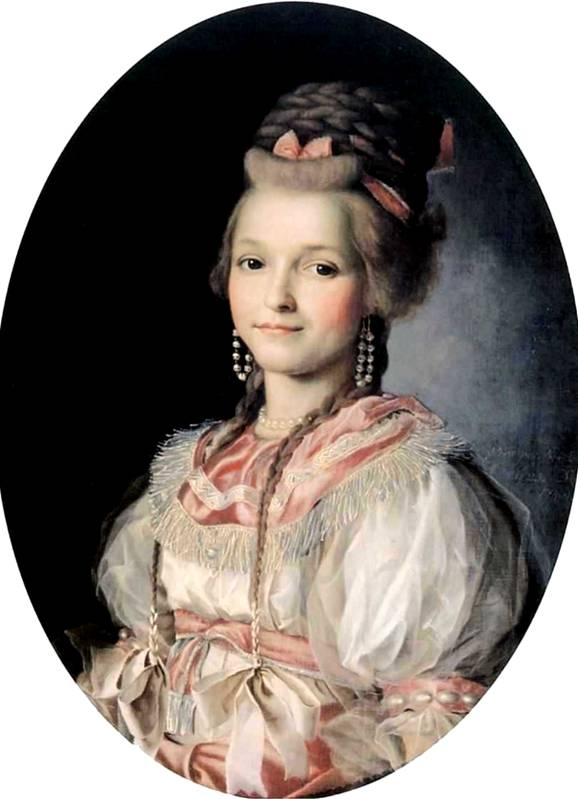
- Tatyana Shlykova
- Born: Tatyana Vasilyevna Shlykova; 1773; Russian Empire
- Died: 1863 (aged 89–90); Russian Empire
- Other name: Granatova
- Occupations: Ballerina, opera singer, actress
- Parent(s): Vasily Shlykov; Elena Shlykova

Tatyana Shlykova, also known by her stage name Granatova (The Garnet) (Russian: Татьяна Васильевна Шлыкова-Гранатова; 1773–1863), was a Russian ballerina and opera singer.

She was the daughter of Vasily Shlykov and Elena Shlykova, serfs of count Peter Borisovich Sheremetev, and trained in manners, recitation, French, Italian, music, singing and dancing to act in the famous Sheremetev theatre of serfs, where she was enrolled as its first ballet dancer in 1780. She became a noted artist and performed in many leading ballet roles, both comic and dramatic, and was noted by empress Catherine the Great. She was freed in 1803.

She died childless while serving as a monk.
