= Vitaly Shlykov =

Russian spymaster

Vitaly Shlykov Виталий Шлыков
- Born: Vitaly Shlykov; 4 February 1934; Kursk, USSR
- Died: 19 November 2011 (aged 77); Moscow, Russia
- Burial place: Troyekurovsky Cemetery
- Occupation: Spymaster
- Awards: Order of the Red Star
- Espionage activity
- Allegiance: Soviet Union (Russia) Russian Federation
- Service branch: GRU
- Service years: 1958–1988
- Rank: Colonel
- Codename: Bob
- Codename: Nikolaev Vasilyevich

Vitaly Shlykov (Russian: Виталий Васильевич Шлыков; 1934–2011) was a spymaster in the GRU, Russian deputy minister of defence and founder of the influential Council for Foreign and Defense Policy.

== Spying career ==
Shlykov was arrested in Switzerland in January 1983 following his betrayal by Dieter Gerhardt under U.S. Central Intelligence Agency interrogation. Gerhardt was a South African national who spied for the Soviet Union for 20 years before his position was compromised by the Farewell Dossier. Shlykov was arrested when he travelled to Zurich under the false name Nikolaev Mikhail Vasilyevich to meet with Gerhardt's wife, Ruth, who acted as a courier. Despite not disclosing his real name or any other details to Swiss authorities, he was jailed for three years for spying for the Soviet Union.

After his release from prison in 1986, he started the Council for Foreign and Defence Policy, an influential think tank that provides advice to the Kremlin on security issues.

He later rose to the position of deputy minister of defence in the Russian Federation under Boris Yeltsin.

== Analysis of the demise of the Soviet Union ==
Shlykov argued with his superiors that the Soviet Union was basing its military and economic policies on faulty assumptions, inherited from the Joseph Stalin era.

Namely, he posited that the Soviet war plans were based on the assumption that the upcoming military conflict between the USSR and NATO would strategically and technologically resemble World War II.

To prepare for this contingency, it was planned to mobilize between 4 and 8 million soldiers and to continuously supply them with enormous quantities of material: tanks, cannon, planes etc., since it was expected that the materiel (and the soldiers) would be constantly attrited at a high rate.

Therefore, most industrial plants in the USSR were required to set aside significant production capacities during peacetime, in order to "mobilize" them when war broke out and to produce the requisite enormous quantities of war materiel. This had the effect of severely undermining the Soviet economy.

Shlykov argued that the assumption that World War III would resemble World War II was wrong and that the above-described approach was ruining the Soviet economy without actually preparing it for possible future conflicts. He pointed out that the Western powers opted out of the World War II-era approach and were actively developing "smart" weapons in order to counter the Soviet preponderance in manpower and classical materiel.

For his efforts he was summarily dismissed from the Soviet Army. He later published his arguments after the fall of the Soviet Union in the open press.
