= Line X =

Soviet KGB division tasked with acquiring and copying Western technology

Line X was a section of the KGB First Chief Directorate residency organization assigned to acquire Western technology for the Directorate of Scientific and Technical Intelligence (Directorate "T"). It is reported that by 1982, around 200 to 350 Line X agents were employed abroad. In the early 1980s, about 200 Line X agents were exposed or compromised as a consequence of the Farewell Dossier, collapsing the Line X operations in Europe.

== Context ==
Line X was an operation by the Soviet Union that was established during the Cold War. The operation mainly sent spies from USSR to acquire technology from the West, primarily from the United States. The Soviet Union's intelligence agencies thoroughly targeted technological advancements and weapons created in Western countries to strengthen their own military and technological capabilities.

== Motives ==
The reason behind the operation was the threats posed by the United States and some of its allies. The mission’s primary goal was to strengthen their defense systems by utilizing radars and warning them about incoming missile attacks, allowing the Soviet Union to prepare for and defend against the attacks swiftly. They also needed superior weaponry to match or overpower the quality of their enemies, forcing them to seek out high-end Western technology. Line X operated through encrypted channels using advanced technology to ensure their messages were safely transmitted without interception by their adversaries.

== Methods ==
There were many effective methods through which the Soviet Union acquired technology. They recruited agents from governments and the military primarily in the United States, although some agents operated overseas. They also arranged illegal trade through third countries to elude the United States’ export control and made good use of intercepting messages from the United States and other Western countries to obtain important information. Some other methods included exploiting technological transmissions and collecting information that was available in Western countries. The Soviet Union's espionage network was sophisticated, allowing them to effectively gather and utilize Western technological advancements.

== History ==
Over time, the Soviet Union made acquiring United States technology an important aspect of their military strategy, particularly though the Military-Industrial Commission (VPK). The VPK was selective about the weapons and components they collected, focusing on the most advanced and strategically important technologies, with a requirement list of technologies to possess from abroad published. Since Line X was created, the Soviet Union made acquiring technology a priority, whether it was obtained legally or illegally. The main objective was to support Warsaw Pact military programs. This helped them develop better weapons, improve existing ones, decrease costs, and increase efficiency in the Soviet Union’s defenses. The acquisition of technology began in the 1930s, and due to the high level of effort, the USSR and Warsaw Pact increased their military capabilities significantly. This intense focus on technological acquisition forced the United States to consume more materials and resources to strengthen its defense efforts in response. The Soviet Union's efforts extended to nuclear weapons developed in the United States, which were also copied. Many nuclear warheads, advanced explosives, and missiles benefited the Soviet Union’s defense and military systems. Some weapons were even replicated entirely, such as the US Sidewinder missile and the US Redeye missile. The strategic importance of these technological acquisitions played a significant role in the balance of power during this period and showed how the Soviet Union was able to take advantage of its adversaries.

== Bibliography ==
- The Technology Acquisition Efforts of the Soviet Intelligence Services (U) (PDF) (Interagency Intelligence Memorandum). CIA (published October 1999). June 1982. NI IIM 82-10002. Archived (PDF) from the original on August 11, 2021.
