= Urengoy =

Settlement in Tyumen Oblast, Russia

Coordinates: 65°58′N 78°22′E

Urengoy (Russian: Уренго́й; Nenets: Пюра ңо, Pjura ŋo) is an urban locality (an urban-type settlement) in Purovsky District of Yamalo-Nenets Autonomous Okrug, Russia. Population: 5,845 (2021 census); 10,066 (2010 census); 9,329 (2002 census); 11,868 (1989 Soviet census).

== History ==
Urengoy was founded in 1932 as a Nenets settlement. Between 1949 and 1953, the construction of the railway between Salekhard and Igarka was coordinated from Urengoy, and a large number of convicted prisoners were moved to Urengoy to work on the construction sites. The construction was frozen in 1953, and the prisoners were moved out of Urengoy. The railway was never completed.

== Economy ==
The Urengoy gas field was named after the settlement.
