= Yamburg gas field =

Gas field in Yamalo-Nenets Autonomous Okrug, Tyumen Oblast, Russia

- Country: Russia
- Region: Yamalo-Nenets Autonomous Okrug
- Offshore/onshore: Onshore
- Coordinates: 67.9°N 74.85°E
- Operators: Gazprom Dobycha Yamburg
- Partners: Gazprom

Field history
- Discovery: 1969
- Start of production: 1986

Production
- Estimated gas in place: 289,542×10^{9} cu ft (8,198.9×10^{9} m^{3})
- Producing formations: Upper Cretaceous reservoir rocks

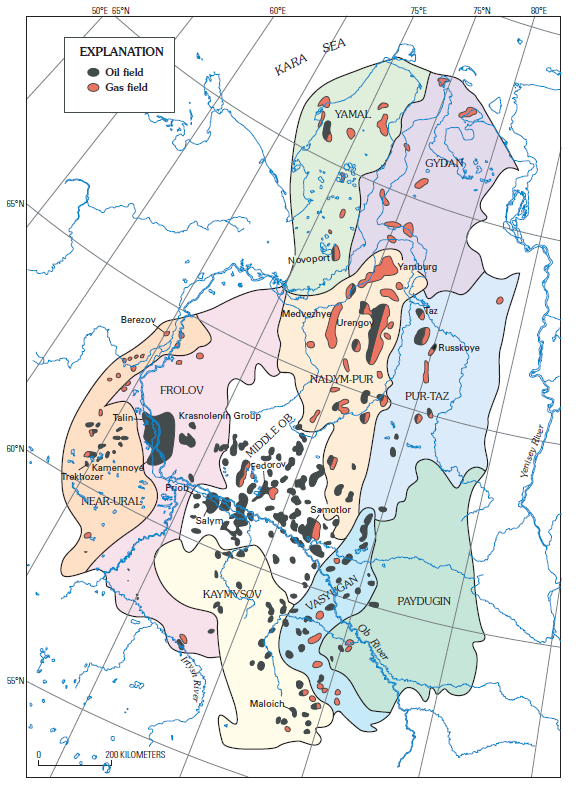
West Siberian petroleum basin oil and gas fields

The Yamburg gas field is the world's third largest natural gas field located 148.5 kilometres (92.3 mi) north of the Arctic Circle in the Tazovsky and Nadymsky districts in Yamalo-Nenets Autonomous Okrug, Tyumen Oblast, Russia.

== History ==
It was discovered in 1969 by Vasiliy Podshibyakin. Development of the field started in 1980, production started in 1986. It is operated by Gazprom Dobycha Yamburg, a subsidiary of Gazprom.

== Reserves ==
The total geological reserves are estimated at 8.2 trillion cubic meters of natural gas, mostly from Upper Cretaceous reservoir rocks at depths of 1,000–1,210 metres (3,280–3,970 ft). The gas field has an area of around 170 kilometres (110 mi) by 50 kilometres (31 mi).

== Operations ==
Since starting operations, Yamburg has produced more than 4.5 trillion cubic meters of natural gas as of October 2012. In later years, production has moved to the peripheral areas of the field, such as the Aneryakhinskaya and Kharvutinskaya areas. The main export pipeline from the Yamburg field is called the Progress pipeline.
