= Orenburg gas field =

Natural gas field in Orenburg Oblast, Russia

Orenburg
- Location within Russia
- Country: Russia
- Region: Orenburg Oblast
- Offshore/onshore: Onshore
- Coordinates: 51.6541°N 54.7969°E
- Operator: Gazprom

Field history
- Discovery: 1966
- Start of production: 1972

Production
- Current production of gas: 49×10^{6} m^{3}/d 1.7×10^{9} cu ft/d
- Estimated gas in place: 1.77×10^{12} m^{3} 62×10^{12} cu ft

The Orenburg gas field is a natural gas field located in the Orenburg Oblast, Russia. It was discovered in 1966 and developed by Gazprom. It began production in 1972 and produces natural gas and natural gas condensates. The total proven reserves of the Orenburg gas field are around 62 trillion cubic feet (1770 km^{3}). As of 2013 production was expected to be around 1.7 billion cubic feet per day (49×10^{5} m^{3}) in 2013.

Gas from the field is exported via the Soyuz (Orenburg–Western border) pipeline.
