= Urengoy gas field =

World's second largest natural gas field

- Location within Russia
- Country: Russia
- Region: Yamalo-Nenets Autonomous Okrug
- Offshore/onshore: onshore
- Coordinates: 66.1°N 76.9°E
- Operator: Gazprom dobycha Urengoy
- Partner: Gazprom

Field history
- Discovery: 1966
- Start of production: 1978

Production
- Current production of oil: 16,500 barrels per day (~8.22×10^{5} t/a)
- Current production of gas: 25,152×10^{6} cu ft/d (712.2×10^{6} m^{3}/d)
- Estimated gas in place: 353,000×10^{9} cu ft (10,000×10^{9} m^{3})
- Producing formations: Cretaceous sandstones

The Urengoy gas field in the northern West Siberia Basin is the world's second largest natural gas field after South Pars / North Dome Gas-Condensate field. It lies in the Yamalo-Nenets Autonomous Okrug, Tyumen Oblast, Russia, just south of the Arctic Circle in North Asia. It is named after the settlement of Urengoy. The gas field is operated by Gazprom Dobycha Urengoy and serviced by the town of Novy Urengoy, founded in 1973.

== History ==
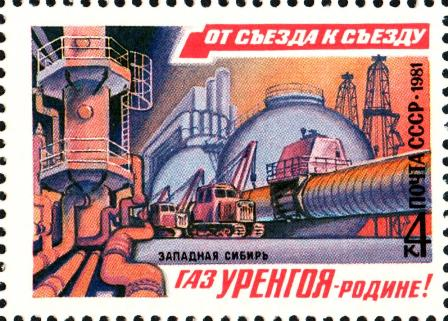
Urengoy gas - for the Motherland! West Siberia. Post of USSR, 1981.

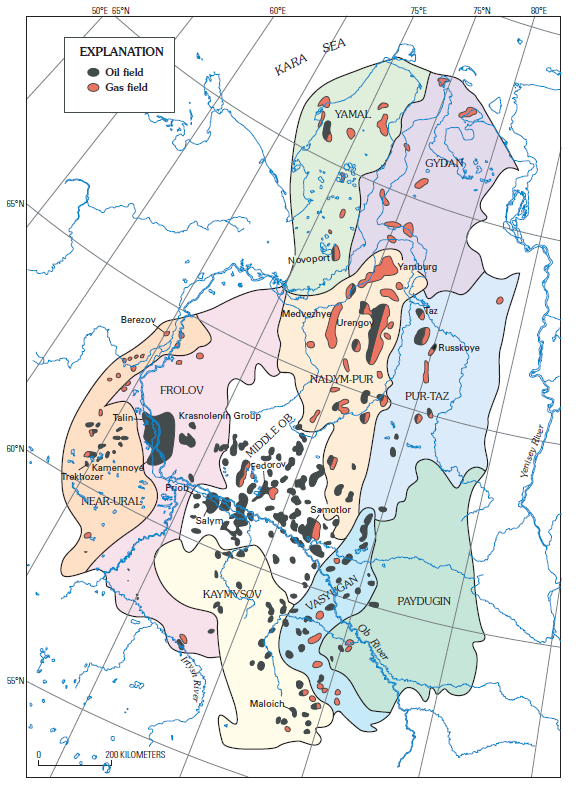
West Siberian petroleum basin oil and gas fields

Urengoy gas field was discovered in June 1966. The first drilling hole hit gas on 6 July 1966 and the field started production in 1978. On 25 February 1981, Urengoy extracted its first one hundred billion cubic meters (10^{11} m^{3}) of natural gas. From January 1984, Urengoy gas started to be exported to Western Europe through the Urengoy–Pomary–Uzhhorod pipeline. A fire hit the Urengoy in 2021 which led to an increase in natural gas prices. In June 2022 the gas field caught fire again.

== Production ==
The Urengoyskoye conventional gas field has over ten trillion cubic meters (10^{13} m^{3}) in total deposits. It recovered by the end of 2021 more than 90% of its reserves. As of 2021, its output was six times lower than at its peak from 1985 to 1996, but it still accounted for 3% of the country's natural gas output. The Urengoy gas field extracts 230 billion cubic meters of natural gas per year, plus condensate and oil. In September 2013, Gazprom announced that a total of 6.5 trillion cubic meters of gas had been produced.
