= Gazprom =

Russian oil and gas company

Gazprom PJSC

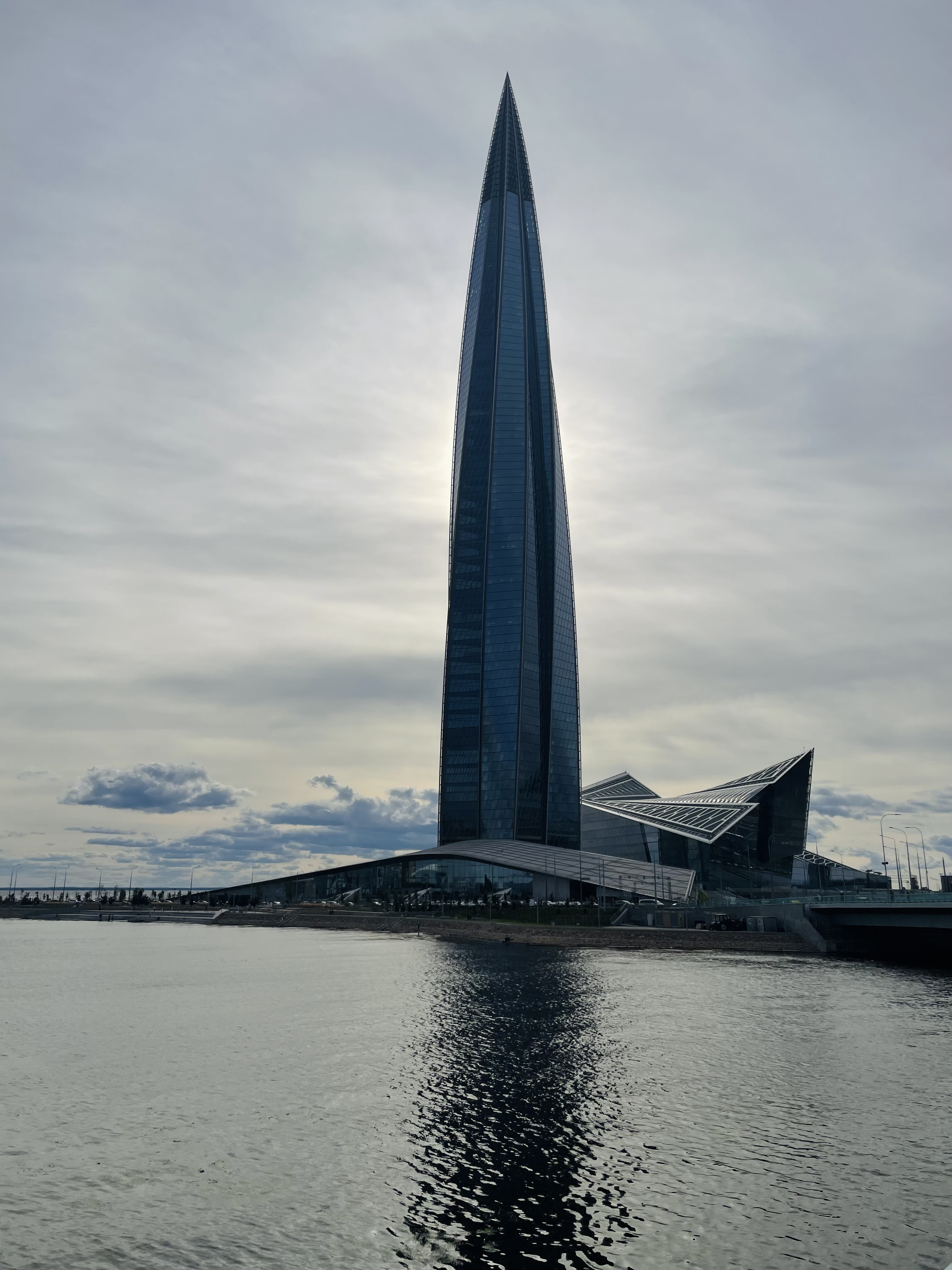
- Gazprom's headquarters in the Lakhta Center in Saint Petersburg, the tallest building in Europe
- Native name: ПАО "Газпром"
- Type: State-owned company Public (PAO)
- Traded as: MCX: GAZP
- Industry: Oil and gas
- Founded: 8 August 1989; 37 years ago
- Headquarters: Lakhta Center, Saint Petersburg, Russia
- Key people: Viktor Zubkov (Chairman); Alexey Miller (CEO)
- Products: Petroleum; Natural gas Petrochemicals
- Services: Gas pipeline transport
- Revenue: $115 billion (2025)
- Operating income: $15.4 billion (2025)
- Net income: $15.8 billion (2025)
- Total assets: $324 billion (2020)
- Total equity: $205 billion (2020)
- Owner: Russian government (50.23%)
- Number of employees: 466,000 (2018)
- Subsidiaries: List of subsidiaries
- Website: gazprom.com

PJSC Gazprom (Russian: ПАО «Газпром», IPA: [ɡɐsˈprom]) is a Russian state-owned multinational energy corporation headquartered in the Lakhta Center in Saint Petersburg. The Gazprom name is a contraction of the Russian words gazovaya promyshlennost (газовая промышленность, gas industry). In December 2024, Gazprom ranked fifth in the list of the largest companies in Russia by market capitalization. In 2023, the company's revenue amounted to 8.5 trillion rubles, a significant decline from the 11.7 trillion rubles it reported in 2022.

Vertically integrated, Gazprom is active in the hydrocarbons sector, with activities including exploration and production, refining, transport, distribution and marketing, and power generation. In 2018, Gazprom produced twelve percent of the global output of natural gas: 497.6 billion cubic meters of natural and associated gas and 15.9 million tonnes of gas condensate. Gazprom distributes gas through pipelines that the company builds and owns across Russia and abroad, such as Power of Siberia and TurkStream. In 2023 it produced 359 billion cubic meters of natural and associated gas, a decline of approximately 13 percent from the previous year.In the same year, Gazprom had proven reserves of 35.1 trillion cubic meters of gas and 1.6 billion tons of gas condensate. Gazprom is also a large oil-producer through its subsidiary Gazprom Neft, producing about 41 million tons (730 million barrels) of oil with reserves amounting to 2 billion tons (35 billion barrels). The company also has subsidiaries in other industrial sectors, including finance, media and aviation; and majority stakes in other companies.

Gazprom formed in 1989, when the government converted the Soviet Ministry of Gas Industry into a corporation to become the first state-run corporate enterprise in the Soviet Union. After the Soviet Union's dissolution in 1991, Gazprom was privatized, retaining its Russia-based assets. At that time, Gazprom evaded taxes and state regulations and engaged in asset stripping. The company returned to government control in the early 2000s, and since then, the company has been involved in the Russian government's diplomatic efforts, setting of gas prices, and access to pipelines.

The company is majority-owned by the Russian government, via the Federal Agency for State Property Management and Rosneftegaz, while the remaining shares are traded publicly. Gazprom is listed on the Moscow Exchange. Many arbitration cases have been decided against Gazprom.

In 2024, Gazprom was responsible for 1,065 Mt of CO_{2} emissions, which was 2.76% of global CO_{2} emissions.

== History ==
=== Origins ===
In 1943, during World War II, the government of the Soviet Union developed a domestic gas industry. In 1965, it centralized gas exploration, development, and distribution within the Ministry of Gas Industry. In the 1970s and 1980s, the Ministry of Gas Industry found large natural gas reserves in Siberia, the Ural region, and the Volga Region. The Soviet Union became a significant producer of gas. In August 1989, under the leadership of the minister of Gas Industry of the Soviet Union (1985-1989) Viktor Chernomyrdin, the Ministry of Gas Industry was renamed the State Gas Concern Gazprom, and became the Soviet Union's first state-run corporate enterprise. In late 1991, when the Soviet Union dissolved, gas industry assets were transferred to newly established national companies, such as Naftogaz and Turkmengaz. Gazprom kept assets located in Russia and secured a monopoly in the gas sector.

=== Privatization ===
In December 1992, when Boris Yeltsin, the Russian president, appointed Viktor Chernomyrdin, Gazprom's chairman, his prime minister, the company's political influence increased. Rem Viakhirev took the chairmanship of Gazprom's Board of Directors and Managing Committee. Following the Decree of the President of the Russian Federation of 5 November 1992, and the Resolution of the Government of Russia of 17 February 1993, Gazprom became a joint-stock company. Gazprom began to distribute shares under the voucher method. (Each Russian citizen received vouchers to purchase shares of formerly state-owned companies). By 1994, 33% of Gazprom's shares had been bought by 747,000 members of the public, mostly in exchange for vouchers. Fifteen percent of the stock was allocated to Gazprom employees. The state retained 40% of the shares. That amount was gradually lowered to thirty-eight percent. Trading of Gazprom's shares was heavily regulated. Foreigners were prohibited from owning more than nine percent of the shares. In October 1996, 1% of Gazprom's equity was offered for sale to foreigners as Global Depository Receipts. In 1997, Gazprom offered a bond issue of US$2.5 billion.

Chernomyrdin, as Prime Minister of Russia, ensured Gazprom avoided tight state regulation. Gazprom evaded taxes, and the Government of Russia received little in dividends. Gazprom managers and board members, such as Chernomyrdin and the Gazprom Chief Executive Officer, Rem Viakhirev, engaged in asset-stripping. Gazprom assets were shared amongst their relatives. Itera, a gas trading company, also received Gazprom assets. In March 1998, for reasons unrelated to his activities at Gazprom, Chernomyrdin was fired by Yeltsin. On 30 June 1998, Chernomyrdin was made chairman of the board of directors of Gazprom.

=== State control ===
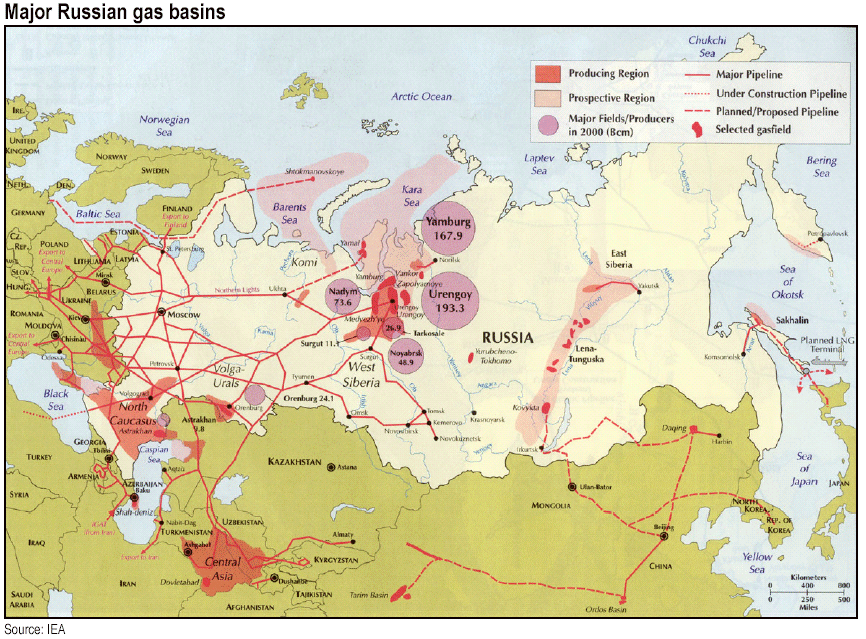
Major Russian natural gas basins in 2000

In June 2000, when acting-president Vladimir Putin became the president of Russia, he acted to gain control over Russia's oligarchs, and to increase the Government of Russia's control in important companies through a program of national champions. Putin fired Chernomyrdin from his position as the chairman of the Gazprom board. The Russian Government's stock in Gazprom gave Putin the power to vote out Viakhirev. Dmitry Medvedev and Alexei Miller – former Putin employees in Saint Petersburg – took over from Chernomyrdin and Viakhirev. Putin's actions were aided by the shareholder activism of Hermitage Capital Management Chief Executive Officer William Browder, and by the former Russian finance minister Boris Fyodorov. Miller and Medvedev were tasked with halting asset-stripping at Gazprom and with recovering the associated losses. Itera was denied access to Gazprom's pipelines and came close to bankruptcy. In 2006, Itera agreed to return stolen assets to Gazprom for a fee. Browder was deported from Russia in 2005, and the Russian arm of Hermitage Capital Management was seized two years later.

In April 2001, Gazprom acquired NTV, Russia's only nationwide state-independent television station, from Vladimir Gusinsky's company, Media-Most Holdings. Gusinsky fell out of Putin's favor after using NTV to publish criticism from the families of sailors who died during the Kursk submarine disaster of August 2000 and additional criticism of Putin's handling of the Second Chechen War of 1999 to 2009. Gusinsky fled Russia in 2000, allowing Gazprom to take over NTV without his opposition.

In June 2005, Gazprombank, Gazpromivest Holding, Gazfond and Gazprom Finance B. V., subsidiaries of Gazprom, sold a 10.7399% share of their stock for $7 billion to Rosneftegaz, a state-owned company. Some analysts said the amount paid by Rosneftegaz for the stock was too low. The sale was completed by 25 December 2005, and with the purchased stock and the thirty-eight percent share held by the State Property Committee, the Government of Russia gained control of Gazprom. The Government of Russia revoked the Gazprom twenty-percent foreign-ownership rule; the company became open to foreign investment. In September 2005, Gazprom bought 72.633 percent of the oil company Sibneft for $13.01 billion. Sibneft was renamed Gazprom Neft (Gazprom Oil). The purchase was aided by a $12 billion loan. Gazprom became Russia's largest company. On the day of the deal the company worth was valued at £69.7 billion (US$123.2 billion).

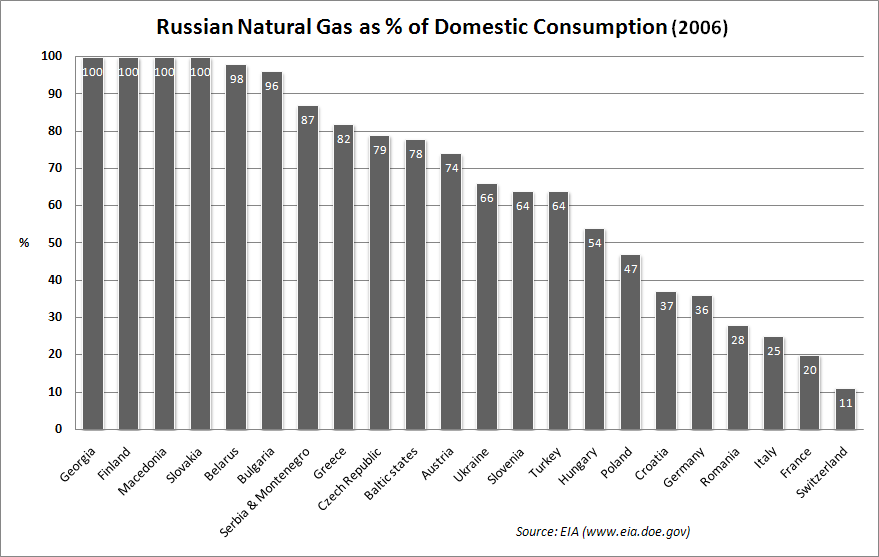
Countries dependent on Russian natural gas (2006)

In July 2006 Russia's State Duma passed the law On Gas Export with a nearly unanimous vote. This law gave Gazprom the exclusive right to export natural gas from Russia. In December 2006, Gazprom signed an agreement with Royal Dutch Shell, Mitsui and Mitsubishi, to take over fifty percent plus one share of Sakhalin Energy. The Gazprom corporate slogan of 2006: "Dreams Come True" (Russian: Мечты сбываются) achieved wide resonance.

In June 2007, TNK-BP, a subsidiary of BP plc, agreed to sell its stake in the Kovykta field in Siberia to Gazprom after the Government of Russia questioned BP's right to export gas from Russia.

On 1 August 2007, Gazprom's Sergey Kuprianov threatened to stop supplying Belarus with Gazprom gas if Minsk failed to pay off its debts, and if so, it would experience a 300% price-increase. Two days later, Kuprianov saw significant progress towards payment, and expected to be paid by the following week.

On 23 June 2007, the governments of Russia and Italy signed a memorandum of understanding towards a joint venture between Gazprom and Eni SpA to construct a 558-mile (900 km) gas pipeline to carry 1.05 trillion cubic feet (30 km^{3}) gas per year from Russia to Europe. This South Stream pipeline would extend under the Black Sea to Bulgaria with a south fork to Italy and a north fork to Hungary.

On 18 December 2007, Frank-Walter Steinmeier (then Foreign Minister of Germany) and Dmitry Medvedev (then First Deputy Prime Minister of Russia) signed an agreement on behalf of BASF to exploit another gas field. At the time, German demand was 40% covered by Russian supply. Some German academics warned that Germany had become too dependent on Russia, but Steinmeier, citing the new Ostpolitik, disregarded them.

On 11 February 2008, Kuprianov threatened Ukraine with a halt to supply; in January 2009, the threat was carried out, marking the beginning of the 2009 Russia–Ukraine gas dispute. BASF's Jürgen Hambrecht expressed concern about the reliability of his firm's supply, but Miller assuaged his worries in a phone call, and the Europeans did nothing to change course for more than a decade.

On 1 December 2014, during a visit to Turkey, Putin said the South Stream project would not proceed and that Russia would ship 63 billion cubic metres per year (bcm/y) of gas to Turkey instead of to Bulgaria. Bulgaria was being sued by the European Union for signing a contract with Russia which was not aligned with European Union regulations. The president of Bulgaria, Rosen Plevneliev, pressured the European Union and Russia to resolve the matter quickly.

=== Continual rise ===
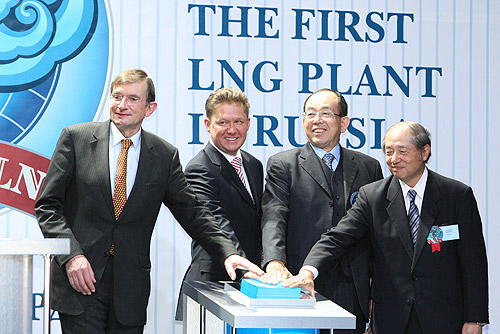
The ceremony marking the opening of a LNG production plant built as part of the Sakhalin-II project

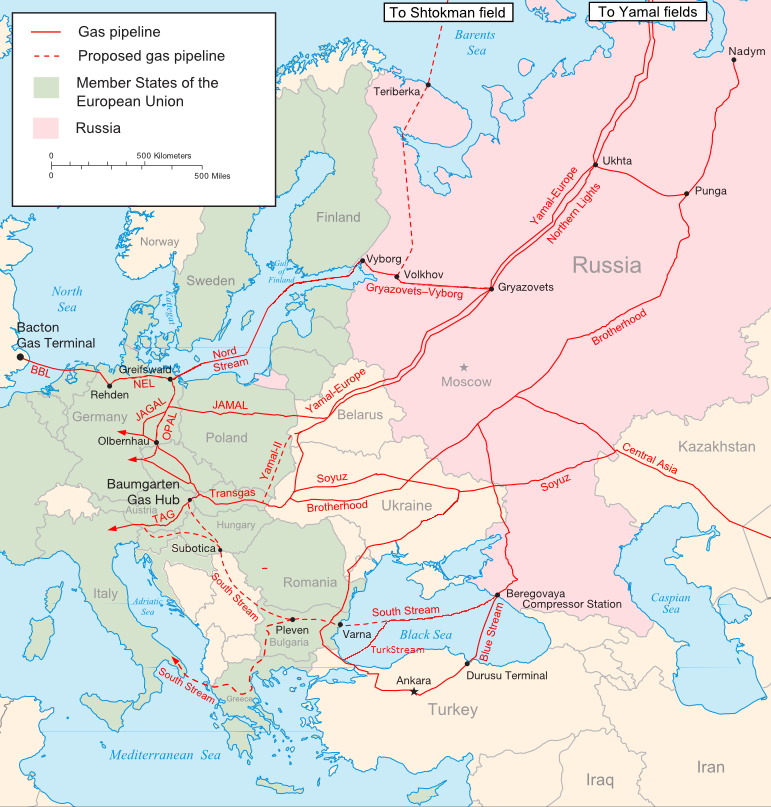
Natural gas pipelines from Russia to Europe in 2009

On 4 September 2012, the European Commission announced an anti-trust investigation into Gazprom's activities. This was based on "concerns that Gazprom may be abusing its dominant market position in upstream gas supply markets." In late November 2013, Gazprom expanded its media interests by acquiring Profmedia from Vladimir Potanin.

On 21 May 2014, in Shanghai, Gazprom and the China National Petroleum Corporation made a contract worth $400 billion over thirty years. The contract was for Gazprom to deliver 38 billion cubic meters of natural gas per year to China beginning in 2018. In August 2014, construction began with pipes for the Power of Siberia pipeline delivered to Lensk, Yakutia. Russia will start supplying natural gas to China through the Power of Siberia pipeline on 20 December 2019 as part of the two countries' $400 billion energy pact. Beijing and Moscow are now negotiating over a second Far Eastern gas pipeline.

In June 2014, Gazprom negotiated with the International Petroleum Investment Company (IPIC of Abu Dhabi) over a 24.9 percent stake in the Austrian oil and gas firm OMV. In July 2014, Gazprom acquired Central Partnership, one of the largest film distributors in Russia.

In September 2015, the Nord Stream 2 contracts were signed, and by July 2021, the pipeline was commissioned.

=== Loss of EU revenue ===
Following the Russian invasion of Ukraine in February 2022, the threat by Russia of reducing the supply of gas to Europe risked the Gazprom export market. When it was implemented, exports by Gazprom decreased from the 185 Bcm achieved in 2021 to 100 Bcm in 2022 and further declined in 2023. The revenue of Gazprom, initially supported by high prices, collapsed in 2023, resulting in a trading loss and necessitating a 34% price increase in the domestic market over three years. Gazprom has also become subject to compensation claims for failure to supply gas under long-term contracts. In April 2025, Gazprom announced that it would begin producing home appliances.

== Supply and reserves ==
Countries by natural gas proven reserves (2014). Russia has the world's largest reserves.

=== Production ===
In 2011, Gazprom produced 513.17 billion cubic metres (18.122 trillion cubic feet) of natural gas, which was 17 percent of the worldwide production and 83 percent of Russian production. Of this amount, the Yamburg subsidiary produced 41 percent, Urengoy 23.6 percent, Nadym 10.9 percent, Noyabrsk 9.3 percent and others 15.2 percent. Additionally, the company produced 32.28 million tons of oil and 12.07 million tons of gas condensate.

The majority of Gazprom's fields are located in the Nadym-Pur-Taz region (near the Gulf of Ob) in Yamalo-Nenets Autonomous Okrug in Western Siberia. Historically, the three largest fields are Medvezhe, Urengoy and Yamburg. After more than twenty years of production, the fields are now in decline. Production from the fields has decreased by twenty to twenty-five bcm per year. The production at Zaporliarnoe, Gazprom's fourth largest field, increased until 2004, offsetting the decline in the other fields. Since 2004, Gazprom has maintained production by activating new smaller fields and by purchasing production assets from other companies.

Gazprom Neft produces crude oil. In 2005, Gazprom purchased 75 percent of the Gazprom Neft shares for $13.1 billion.

billion cubic metres	2004	2005	2006	2007	2008	2009	2010	2011	2012	2013	2014	2015	2016	2017	2018	2019	2020	2021
Natural gas	552.5	555.0	556.0	548.6	549.7	461.5	508.6	513.2	487.0	487.4	443.9	418.5	419.1	472.1	498.7	501.2	454.5	515.6
million tons	2004	2005	2006	2007	2008	2009	2010	2011	2012	2013	2014	2015	2016	2017	2018	2019	2020	2021
Crude oil	0.9	9.5	34.0	34.0	32.0	31.6	32.0	32.3	33.3	33.8	35.3	36.0	39.3	48.6	48.3	48.0	47.1	48.2
Condensate	11.1	11.5	11.4	11.3	10.9	10.1	11.3	12.1	12.9	14.7	14.5	15.3	15.9	15.9	15.9	16.7	16.2	16.3
Source: Gazprom in figures 2004–2008, 2007–2011, 2009–2013 and 2012–2016. 2017-2019 2020-2021

=== Imports from Central Asia ===
Gazprom's ability to supply natural gas to the domestic market and for reexport relied to a large extent on imports from Central Asia. In 2007, Gazprom imported a total of 60.7 billion cubic metres (2.14 trillion cubic feet) from Central Asia: 42.6 billion cubic metres (1.50 trillion cubic feet) from Turkmenistan, 8.5 billion cubic metres (300 billion cubic feet) from Kazakhstan, and 9.6 billion cubic metres (340 billion cubic feet) from Uzbekistan. In particular, Gazprom purchased seventy-five percent of Turkmenistan gas exports to supply gas to Ukraine. In 2008, Gazprom paid $130/mcm to $180/mcm for gas from Central Asia.

=== Reserves ===
In 2015, Gazprom's proved and probable reserves of natural gas were 23.705 trillion cubic metres (837.1 trillion cubic feet), a 3.8% increase from the 2011 figure, which represented 18.4% of the world's reserves. In 2015, the reserves of crude oil were 1.355 billion tons and the reserves of gas condensate were 933.3 billion tons. 59.8 percent of Gazprom's natural gas reserves (Categories A+B+C1) were located in the Urals Federal District (decreasing), 20.5 percent in the Arctic shelf (increasing), and 8.3 percent in the Southern Federal District and North Caucasus Federal District.

trillion cubic metres	2004	2005	2006	2007	2008	2009	2010	2011	2013	2015	2019	2021
Natural gas	20.90	20.66	20.73	20.84	21.28	21.95	22.52	22.84	23.26	23.71	34.89	30.22
Source: Gazprom in figures 2004–2008, 2007–2011 and 2009–2013. 2019 2021

== Development and exploration ==
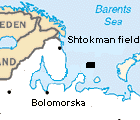
Location of the Shtokman gas field

Gazprom invested approximately 480 billion rubles ($20 billion) in new major projects to maintain its supply. Nearly 37 percent of Gazprom's reserves are located in the Yamal Peninsula and in the Barents Sea.

=== Blue Stream Pipeline ===
One of Gazprom's major projects is the Blue Stream Pipeline. The Blue Stream Pipeline delivers natural gas to Turkey via the Black Sea. In 1997, the Blue Stream Pipeline agreement was signed between Turkey and Russia. In 2000, the first joint was welded. The pipeline transports 16 billion cubic meters each year.

=== Yamal Peninsula ===
Exploration of the Yamal Peninsula has found reserves of over 10 trillion cubic metres of natural gas and over 500 million tons of oil and gas condensate. About 60 percent of these reserves are located in Bovanenkovo, Kharasavey, and Novoportovo. The natural gas production capacity of the Bovanenkovo field was estimated to be 115 billion cubic metres per annum (4.1 trillion cubic feet per annum), with potential to increase to 140 billion cubic metres per annum (4.9 trillion cubic feet per annum).

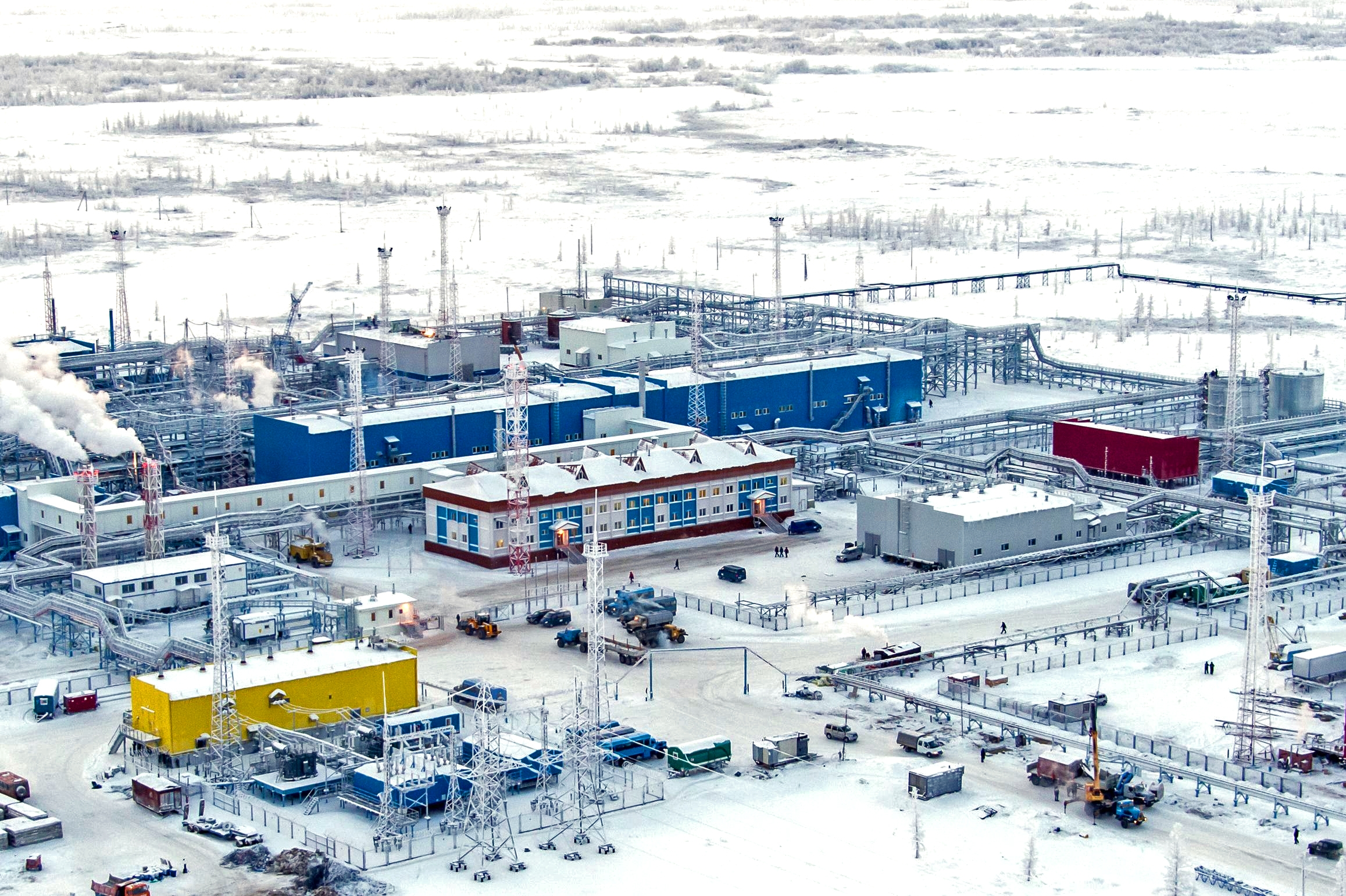
Zapolyarnoye gas field

=== Shtokman field ===
The Shtokman field is one of the world's largest natural gas fields. It is located in the central part of the Barents Sea, 650 kilometres (400 mi) northeast of the city of Murmansk and 1,000 kilometres (620 mi) west of the Yamal Peninsula. The field is estimated to contain up to 3.7 trillion cubic metres (130 trillion cubic feet) of gas. Potential production is 71 billion cubic metres per annum (2.5 trillion cubic feet per annum) in the initial phases, with a potential increase to 95 billion cubic metres per annum (3.4 trillion cubic feet per annum). Gazprom, TotalEnergies (France), and Statoil (Norway) created a joint company, Shtokman Development AG, for the development of the field.

=== Khanty-Mansiysk autonomous area (Arctic shelf) ===
In 2013, in Amsterdam, Alexey Miller, chairman of the Gazprom management committee, and Jorma Ollila, chairman of the board of directors of Royal Dutch Shell, signed in the presence of Putin and Mark Rutte, prime minister of the Netherlands, a memorandum outlining the principles of cooperation within hydrocarbons exploration and development in the Arctic shelf and a section of the deep-water shelf.

=== Exploration ===
In 2008, Gazprom carried out 284.9 kilometres (177.0 mi) of explorative well drilling; 124,000 kilometres (77,000 mi) of 2D seismic and 6,600 square kilometres (2,500 sq mi) of 3D seismic survey. As a result, gas reserves grew by 583.4 billion cubic metres (20.60 trillion cubic feet), and crude oil and gas condensate reserves grew by 61 million tons.

Gazprom carries out prospecting and exploration in foreign countries such as India, Pakistan, Algeria, Venezuela, Vietnam, Libya, Kazakhstan, Uzbekistan, Kyrgyzstan and Tajikistan.

== Transportation ==
Gazprom's Unified Gas Supply System (UGSS) includes 158,200 kilometres (98,300 mi) of gas trunklines and branches and 218 compressor stations with a 41.4 GW capacity. The UGSS is the largest gas transmission system in the world. In 2008, the transportation system carried 714.3 billion cubic metres (25.23 trillion cubic feet) of gas. Gazprom has claimed the UGSS has reached its capacity. Major transmission projects included the Nord Stream pipelines, as well as pipelines inside Russia.

=== Liquefied Natural Gas ===
In 2021, Russia had two large liquefied natural gas (LNG) production plants, Yamal LNG and Sakhalin-2 LNG, both of which Gazprom has an interest in.

In March 2021, the Russian Government authorised a long-term programme to develop and expand the liquefied natural gas industry in Russia with nine more LNG plants, to address the growing global LNG market.

In August 2021 Russia's first LNG bunkering vessel, Dmitry Mendeleev, was completed for Gazprom.

In October 2021, Gazprom and RusGazDobycha announced they would build a new plant, Baltic LNG, at Ust-Luga, with access to the Baltic Sea for sea transportation westward. It would process ethane-containing natural gas with a capacity of 13 million tons of LNG per year.

In 2024, Gazprom faced a significant shortage of LNG tankers, leading the company to use the Marshal Vasilevskiy floating storage and regasification unit (FSRU) for exporting LNG from its Portovaya facility. This shortage occurred because Gazprom's regular tankers, such as the Pskov, were involved in extended voyages to Asia, avoiding the Suez Canal and Red Sea due to security threats from Houthi attacks.

In 2026, amid the Iran War, Gazprom was continuing to ship sanctioned LNG to China.

== Sales ==
In 2006, Gazprom sold 316 billion cubic metres (11.2 trillion cubic feet) of gas to domestic customers; 162 billion cubic metres (5.7 trillion cubic feet) to the rest of Europe; and 101 billion cubic metres (3.6 trillion cubic feet) to CIS countries and the Baltic states. Gazprom received about 60 percent of its revenue from its sales to European customers. In 2008, the average gas price paid by Russian industrial customers was $71/mcm, while households paid $54/mcm.

Since 2000, Natural gas prices have fluctuated. In late 2007, the price of natural gas at the New York NYMEX was $7.53 per million British thermal units ($25.7/MWh). At a conversion of 26,4 m^{3} per million Btu, it would correspond to a price of $285 per 1,000 cubic metres. At the same time, based on their respective contracts with Gazprom, German customers paid $250 per cubic metre (m^{3}), Polish customers $290 per m^{3}, Ukraine customers $130 per m^{3} and Russian customers $49 per m^{3}.

Since the start of the Russian invasion of Ukraine in February 2022, and as a result of falling export revenue, the domestic market is expected to see price rises of 34% by July 2025.

=== Exports ===
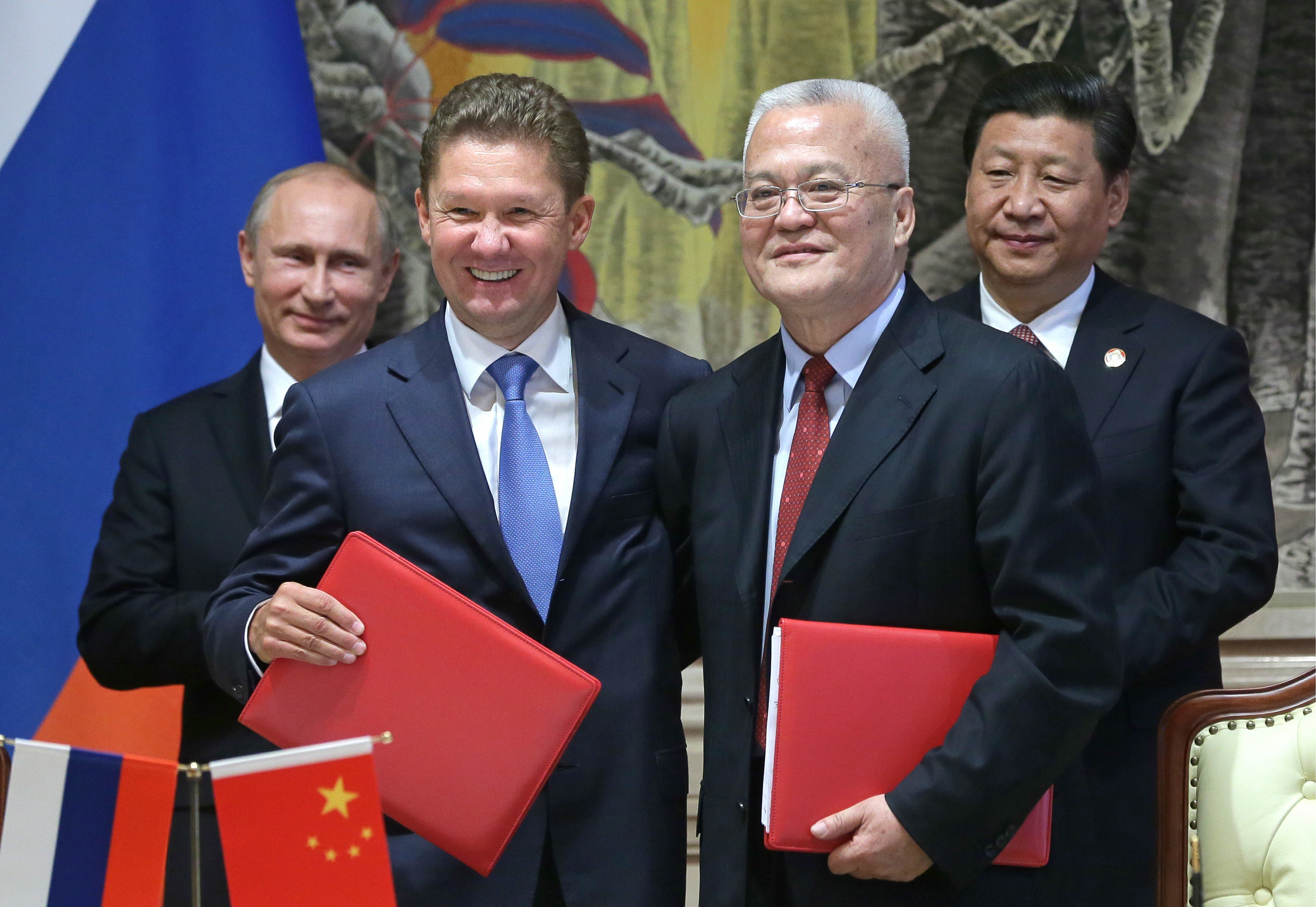
CEO of Gazprom Alexei Miller and Head of the China National Petroleum Company Zhou Jiping signed a $400 billion gas deal for natural gas supplies via the Eastern Route between Gazprom and CNPC, 21 May 2014 Vladimir Putin and Xi Jinping pictured in background.

Gazprom delivered gas to 25 European countries. Its main export arm is Gazprom Export LLC, founded in 1973 and previously known as Gazexport until November 1, 2006, which has a monopoly on gas exports to countries outside the former Soviet Union. The majority of Russian gas in Europe was sold on 25-year contracts. In late 2004, Gazprom was the sole gas supplier to Bosnia and Herzegovina, Estonia, Finland, Macedonia, Latvia, Lithuania, Moldova, Serbia, and Slovakia. It provided 97 percent of Bulgaria's gas, 89 percent of Hungary's gas, 86 percent of Poland's gas, nearly 75 percent of the Czech Republic's, 67 percent of Turkey's, 65 percent of Austria's, about 40 percent of Romania's, 36 percent of Germany's, 27 percent of Italy's, and 25 percent of France's gas. By December 2010 with strong support from Alexander Medvedev and Antonio Fallico, who was Russia's honorary consul in Verona, a former Italian communist and a close associate of both Alexey Anatolievich Matveev (Russian: Алексей Анатольевич Матвеев; born 21 December 1963) and Vladimir Putin, Italy's gas supplied by Russia had greatly increased from 25 percent in 2004 to 70 percent. In May 2006, the European Union received about 25 percent of its gas supply from Gazprom. In 2006, Gazprom entered several long-term gas contracts with European companies. The contract prices were mainly linked to oil prices.

In 2014, Europe accounted for 40% of Gazprom's revenue. The proportion of Europe's gas bought in the spot market rose from 15 percent in 2008 to 44 percent in 2012.

In September 2013, during the G20 summit, Gazprom signed an agreement with China National Petroleum Corporation (CNPC) that the Henry Hub index would not be used to settle prices for their trades. In May 2014, Russian president Putin met with General Secretary of the Chinese Communist Party Xi Jinping and negotiated a $400bn deal between the Gazprom and the CNPC. Under the contract, Russia was to supply 38 billion cubic meters of gas annually over 30 years for $350 per thousand cubic meters beginning in 2018. In 2013, the average price of Gazprom's gas in Europe was about $380 per thousand cubic meters. China offered a loan of about $50bn to finance the development of the gas fields and the construction of the pipeline by Russia up to the Chinese border, with the Chinese to build the remaining pipeline.

In January 2023, as a result of the sanctions imposed on Russia following the 2022 invasion of Ukraine, Gazprom announced that its gas exports had fallen 45% from 185 billion cubic meters (Bcm) to 101 Bcm, mainly due to the loss of the European market. During 2023 exports fell again, with Europe purchasing just 28Bcm, a level not seen since the 1970s.

Ukraine ended all Russian gas supplies to European customers through its pipelines when the transit deal ended on 31 December 2024. The pipelines served Slovakia and Austria, which both have since then made deals for natural gas purchases and imports.

In December 2025, it was announced that Turkey finalized a one-year extension of its expiring gas import contracts with Russia that total 22 Bcm. When asked about the short-term contract, Turkish Energy Minister Bayraktar stated: "They will continue to be supplied by Gazprom next year. But we are focusing on more like short term... like one year".

=== Price disputes ===
On 1 January 2006, during the Russia-Ukraine gas dispute, Gazprom ceased the supply of gas to the Ukrainian market. Gazprom has called on the Ukrainian government to increase its payment for natural gas in line with global fuel price increases. During the night of 3 January 2006, and early morning of 4 January 2006, Naftogas of Ukraine and Gazprom negotiated a deal that temporarily resolved the long-standing gas price conflict between Russia and Ukraine.

On 3 April 2006, Gazprom announced it would triple the price of natural gas to Belarus after 31 December 2006. In December 2006, Gazprom threatened to cease supply of gas to Belarus at 10 am Moscow time on 1 January 2007, unless Belarus increased payments from $47 to $200 per 1,000 cubic metres or to cede control over its distribution network. Some analysts suggested Moscow was penalising Alexander Lukashenko, the president of Belarus, for not delivering on pledges of closer integration with Russia, while others noted that other countries like Armenia were paying as much for their gas as Belarus would with the new price levels.

Gazprom later requested a price of $105, yet Belarus still refused the agreement. Belarus responded that if supplies were cut, it would deny Gazprom access to its pipelines, which would impair gas transportation to Europe. However, on 1 January 2007, just a few hours before the deadline, Belarus and Gazprom signed a last-minute agreement. Under the agreement, Belarus undertook to pay $100 per 1,000 cubic metres in 2007. The agreement also allowed Gazprom to purchase 50 percent of the shares in Beltransgaz, the Belarusian pipeline network. Immediately following the signing of this agreement, Belarus declared a $42/ton transportation tax on Russian oil traveling through the Gazprom pipelines crossing its territory.

On 13 March 2008, after a three-day period during which gas supplies to Ukraine were halved, Gazprom agreed to supply Ukraine with gas for the remainder of the year. The contract removed intermediary companies.

On 1 April 2014, Gazprom increased the gas price charged to Ukraine from $268.50 to $385.50 (£231.00) per 1,000 cubic metres. Ukraine's unpaid gas bills to Russia stood at $1.7bn (£1.02bn). On 30 October 2014, Russia agreed to resume gas supplies to Ukraine over the winter in a deal brokered by the European Union.

== Corporate affairs ==
Gazprom is a vertically integrated company, one that owns its supply and distribution activities. Gazprom owns all its main gas processing facilities in Russia. It operates Russia's high-pressure gas pipelines and, since 2006, it has held a legal export monopoly. Other natural gas producers, such as Novatek, Russia's second largest gas company, are forced to use Gazprom's facilities for processing and transport of natural gas.

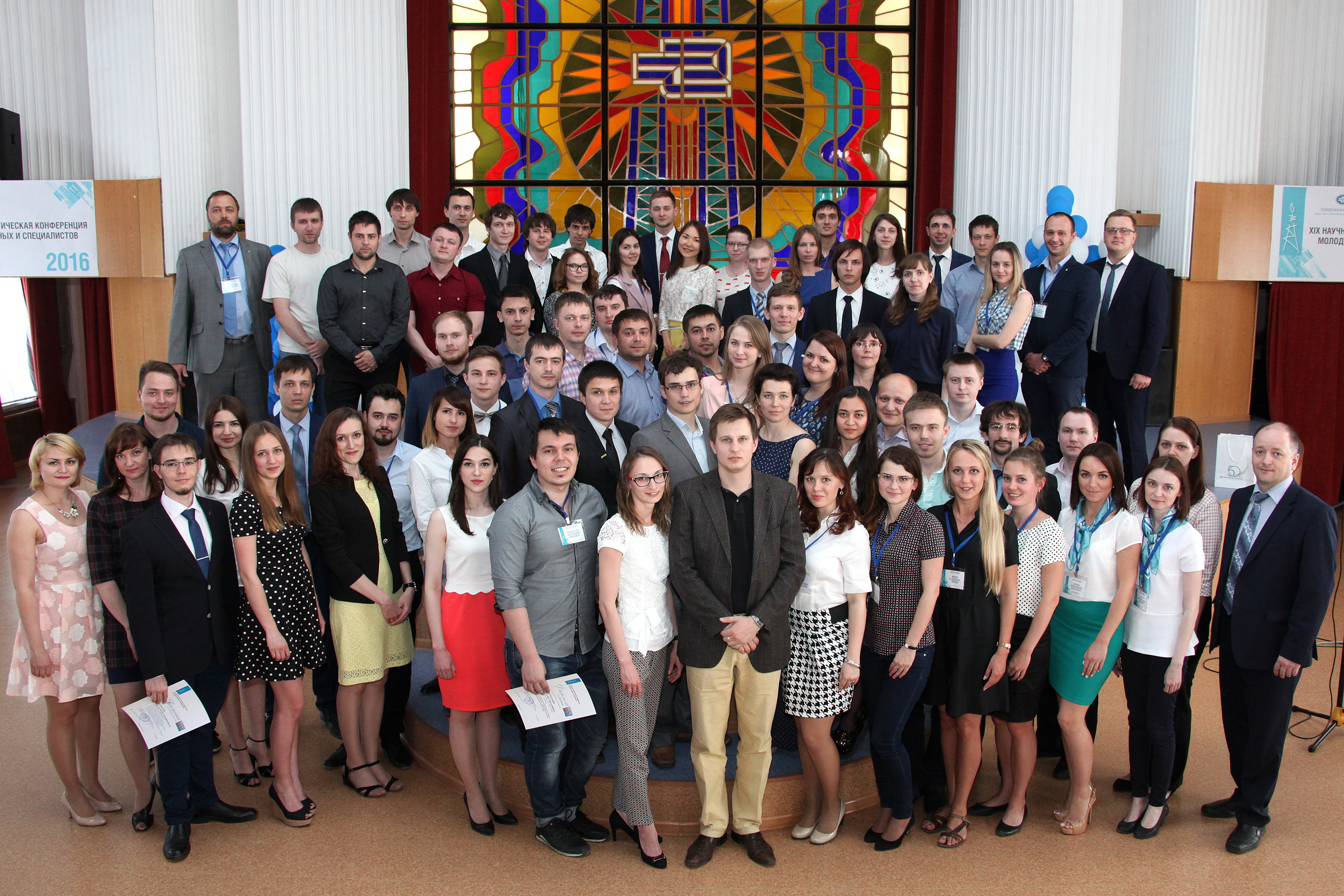
19th conference of Gazprom's young scientists in Tyumen in 2016

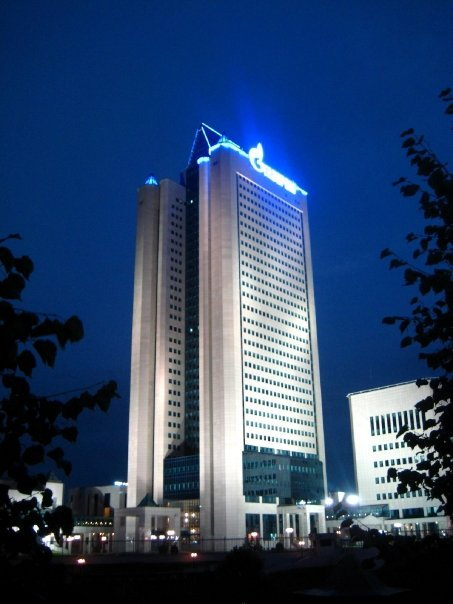
Gazprom's former headquarters in Cheryomushki District, South-Western Administrative Okrug, Moscow

At the end of 2008, Gazprom had 221,300 employees across its major subsidiaries involved in gas production, transportation, underground storage, and processing. Of these employees, 9.5 percent were in management, 22.9 percent were specialists, 63.4 percent were workers and 4.2 percent were other employees. Gazprom's headquarters were in the Cheryomushki District, South-Western Administrative Okrug, Moscow until 2021, when they moved to the Lakhta Center in Saint Petersburg.

Gazprom is a national champion, a concept advocated by Putin, in which large companies in strategic sectors are expected not only to seek profit, but also to advance Russia's national interests. For example, Gazprom sells gas to its domestic market at a price less than that of the global market. In 2008, Gazprom's activities made up 10 percent of the Russian gross domestic product

Due to its large-scale projects, including international pipelines like Nord Stream 1 and Turkish Stream, Gazprom was once a substantial source of revenue for several domestic suppliers and contractors.

=== Shareholders ===
As of 2017, Gazprom's main shareholders were the Federal Agency for State Property Management with 38.37% and Rosneftegaz with 10.97%. Together with a 0.89 share of Rosgazifikatsiya, they guaranteed a majority control of the company by the Russian government. The rest of the shares were held by investors, including 25.20% by ADR holders on foreign stock markets, and 24.57% by other legal entities and individuals.

Gazprom is listed on the stock markets of Moscow and Karachi. It is the top component of the MICEX and RTS indices. Gazprom used to be listed on the London, Berlin, Frankfurt and Singapore markets before the 2022 sanctions.

=== Subsidiaries ===
Gazprom has several hundred subsidiaries in Russia and abroad, which are either directly or indirectly owned and controlled by the company. It has incorporated a subsidiary in the United Kingdom, named Gazprom International UK Ltd, and the Netherlands, named Gazprom International Projects BV.

=== Management ===
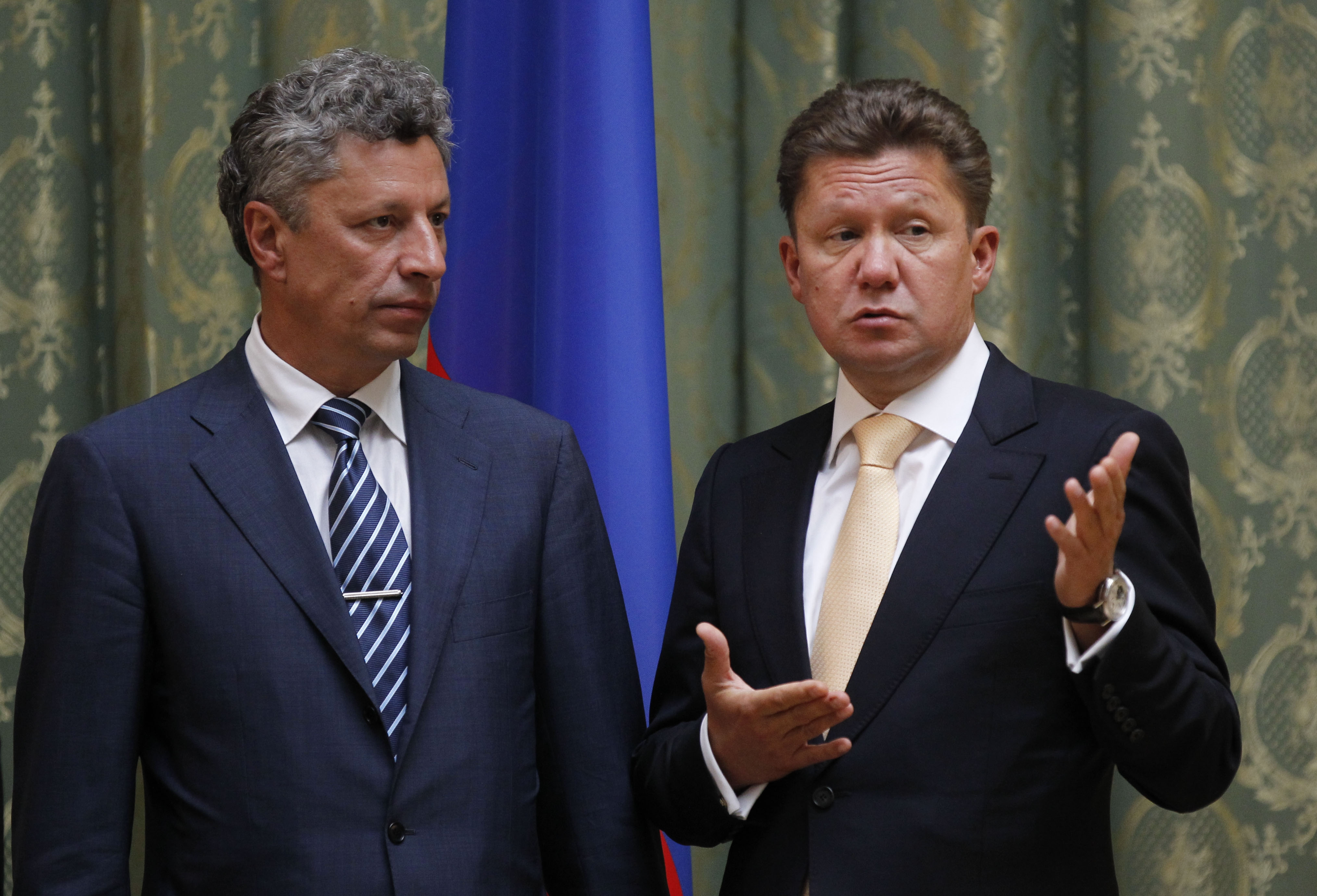
Gazprom CEO Alexei Miller with the Energy Minister of Ukraine Yuriy Boyko, June 2012

Gazprom's Board of Directors as of 9 August 2015:

- Viktor Zubkov (Chairman, Russian Special Presidential Representative for Cooperation with Gas Exporting Countries Forum, First Deputy Prime Minister of Russia, former Prime Minister of Russia)
- Alexey Miller (Deputy Chairman, Chairman of the Management Committee, CEO, Chairman of Gazprombank, former Deputy Minister of Energy of Russia)
- Andrey Akimov (Chairman of Gazprombank)
- Farit Gazizullin (former Minister of State Property of Russia, former Minister of Property Relations of Russia)
- Timur Kulibaev (Chairman of Legal Entities Department)
- Vitaly Markelov (Deputy Chairman of the Management Committee)
- Viktor Martynov (Rector of Gubkin Russian State University of Oil and Gas, Professor)
- Vladimir Mau (Rector of the Russian Presidential Academy of National Economy and Public Administration)
- Valery Musin (Head of the Civil Procedure Department, Faculty of Law, Saint Petersburg State University)
- Alexander Novak (Minister of Energy of the Russian Federation)
- Mikhail Sereda (Deputy Chairman of the Management Committee, Head of the Administration of the Management Committee of Gazprom)

Gazprom's management committee as of December 2006:

- Alexei Miller (Chairman, Deputy Chairman of the Board, CEO, Chairman of Gazprombank, former Deputy Minister of Energy of Russia, member since 2001)
- Alexander Ananenkov (Deputy Chairman, Deputy Chairman of the Board, Gazprom shareholder, member since 17 December 2001)
- Valery Golubev (Deputy Chairman, Head of the Department for Construction and Investment, former Head of the Vasileostrovsky District, former member of the Federation Council of Russia, member since 18 April 2003)
- Alexander Kozlov (Deputy Chairman, member since 18 March 2005)
- Andrey Kruglov (Deputy Chairman, Head of the Department for Finance and Economics, member since 2002)
- Alexander Medvedev (Deputy Chairman, Deputy Chairman of the Board, former Director General of Gazprom Export, President of Kontinental Hockey League, member of the Coordination Committee of RosUkrEnergo, member since 2002)
- Mikhail Sereda (Deputy Chairman, Head of Administration, Deputy Chairman of Gazprombank, member since 28 September 2004)
- Sergei Ushakov (Deputy Chairman, member since 18 April 2003)
- Elena Vasilyeva (Deputy Chairman, Chief Accountant, member since 2001)
- Bogdan Budzulyak (Head of the Department of Gas Transportation, Underground Storage and Utilization, member since 1989)
- Nikolai Dubik (Head of Legal Department, member since 2008)
- Konstantin Chuychenko (Head of the Control Department of Russia, presidential aide to Dmitry Medvedev, former chairman of Gazprom Media, executive director of RosUkrEnergo, former KGB officer, member since 2002)
- Viktor Ilyushin (Head of the Department of Relationships with Regional Authorities of the Russian Federation, member since 1997)
- Olga Pavlova (Head of the Department of Asset Management and Corporate Relations, member since 2004)
- Vasiliy Podyuk (Head of the Department of Gas, Gas Condensate and Oil Production, member since 1997)
- Vlada Rusakova (Head of the Department of Strategic Development, member since 5 September 2003)
- Kirill Seleznev (Head of the Department of Marketing and Processing of Gas and Liquid Hydrocarbons, member since 27 September 2002, Director-General of Mezhregiongaz)

=== Finances ===
	2016	2017	2018	2019	2020	2021	2022	2023	2024	2025
Total revenue (RUB billions)	6,111.1	6,546.1	8,224.2	7,659.6	6,321.6	10,241.4	11,674.0	8,541.8	10,714.7	9,770.7
Operating income (RUB billions)	725.	871.4	1,930.0	1,119.9	614.9	2,411.3	1,935.2	−363.7	1,456.4	1,309.8
Net income (RUB billions)	951.6	714.3	1,456.3	1,202.9	135.3	2,093.1	1,225.8	−629.1	1,218.5	1,306.8
Total assets (RUB billions)	16,918.9	18,238.8	20,810.4	21,882.3	23,352.2	27,047.2	26,128.9	28,713.7	30,698.3	31,890.8
Total equity (RUB billions)	11,441.8	12,015.5	13,776.2	14,615.7	14,804.7	16,866.6	16,445.8	16,452.7	17,661.0	18,893.7
Employees	467,400	469,600	466,100	473,800	477,600	479,200	492,200	498,100	501,000	500,400

== Sports sponsorships ==
Gazprom is the owner and sponsor of the Russian Premier League football club FC Zenit Saint Petersburg and its other sporting departments (Basketball and volleyball), as well as volleyball club VC Zenit-Kazan and Gazprom-Ugra Surgut at Russian Volleyball Super League. Gazprom also owns SKA St Petersburg of the KHL.

On 1 January 2007, Gazprom became the sponsor of the German Bundesliga club FC Schalke 04 at a cost of up to €25 million per year. On 23 November 2009, the partnership was extended for a further five years. Schalke then suspended their sponsorship of Gazprom after the Russian invasion of Ukraine. The sponsorship was worth $150m (USD) over five years.

On 9 July 2010, Gazprom became a sponsor of the Serbian SuperLiga football club Red Star Belgrade.

On 17 July 2012, Gazprom became the official Global Energy partner of the UEFA Champions League 2012 winners Chelsea. The sponsorship continued for three years until 2015.

In September 2013, Gazprom became an official partner of FIFA tournaments from 2015 to 2018. The contract included the 2018 FIFA World Cup in Russia.

Gazprom was also a sponsor for the defunct Minardi F1 team in 2002–2003.

In April 2021, Gazprom became a sponsor of the International Amateur Boxing Association (AIBA, now the International Boxing Association) as "general partner". The sponsorship became controversial due to the IBA's increased Russian ties under president Umar Kremlev. This partnership ended in 2023.

On 9 July 2012, Gazprom became a sponsor of the UEFA Champions League and UEFA Super Cup. The sponsorship continued for three seasons until 2015. In 2021, the partnership was also extended until 2024. The company was also set to serve as the global partner for UEFA Euro 2020 and 2024; however, due to the Russian invasion of Ukraine, Gazprom's sponsorship for the Champions League and Euro 2024 was voided, marking the end of their 10-year partnership with UEFA.

== Environmental record ==
Gazprom is one of the world's largest greenhouse gas emitters, considering the use of its products. A large part of greenhouse gas emissions by Russia are from methane leaks and its many gas-fired power plants.

== Controversies ==
=== Geopolitical leverage ===
Repeatedly, Gazprom has been accused of being a political and economical weapon of Russia, using the supply and price of natural gas to gain control over Europe and most noteworthy, Ukraine. "Regardless of how the stand-off over Ukraine develops, one lesson is clear: excessive dependence on Russian energy makes Europe weak," said Donald Tusk, former prime minister of Poland in April 2014. The friction resulted in two boycott campaigns in Ukraine, one that started in 2005, the other in 2013. Russia denies weaponizing energy via Gazprom. In December 2019, Gazprom paid $2.9 billion to Ukrainian counterpart Naftogaz as ordered by a Stockholm court ruling's award on damage claims stemming from alleged economic harassment.

In the wake of the 2022 Russian invasion of Ukraine, Gazprom had issues with many EU countries, and stated it would cut off supplies to French energy supplier, Engie, over failure to pay in full for deliveries. This was disputed, with France's Energy Transition Minister Agnes Pannier-Runacher stating, "Very clearly Russia is using gas as a weapon of war and we must prepare for the worst case scenario of a complete interruption of supplies."

=== Yukos Oil fraud ===
Yuganskneftegaz was the core production subsidiary of the Yukos Oil Company, which was previously run by a Russian businessman, Mikhail Khodorkovsky. In 2003, the Russian tax authorities charged Yukos and its founder, Khodorkovsky, with tax evasion. On 14 April 2004, Yukos was presented with a bill for over US$35 bn in back taxes and a demand to pay the entire bill the same day. Requests by Yukos to defer payment, allow payment by installments, or to discharge the debt by sale of peripheral assets, including its shareholding in the Sibneft oil company, were also refused.

The bailiffs froze Yukos' shares in Yuganskneftegaz and on 19 November 2004, they placed a notice in the Russian government newspaper Rossiyskaya Gazeta. Yuganskneftegaz would be sold at an auction thirty days later on 19 December 2004. The conditions for participation in the auction included an advance deposit of US$1.7 bn and prior clearance by the Russian Federal Antimonopoly Service. In early December 2004, Gazprom applied to participate in the auction via its wholly owned subsidiary, Gazpromneft.

On 15 December 2004, Yukos filed for bankruptcy protection in a Houston court and obtained a temporary injunction prohibiting Gazprom from participating in the auction. On 16 December 2004, a group of Western banks withdrew their financial support for Gazprom's application. On the same day, Baikalfinansgrup, a previously unknown company, submitted an application to participate in the auction.

On 19 December 2004, only two companies appeared at the auction, Gazpromneft and Baikalfinansgrup. Gazpromneft declined to place any offer. Baikalfinansgrup acquired Yuganskneftegaz on its first bid. On 23 December 2004, Baikalfinansgrup was acquired by Rosneft. Rosneft later disclosed in its annual financial statement that it had financed the acquisition of Yuganskneftegaz. At the time, Sergey Bogdanchikov was the president of Rosneft and the chief executive officer of Gazpromneft.

Shortly after the auction, the planned merger between Gazprom and Rosneft was abandoned, and Bogdanchikov resigned as Chief Executive Officer of Gazpromneft.

On 7 February 2006, in response to a question by a Spanish journalist, Vladimir Putin disclosed that Rosneft had used Baikalfinansgrup as a vehicle to acquire Yuganskneftegaz to protect itself against litigation.

=== Antitrust ===
On 22 April 2015, Gazprom was charged by the European Commission with using territorial restrictions to engage in anticompetitive behavior and using its dominant position to impose unfair prices. The company was accused of preventing competition in Bulgaria, the Czech Republic, Estonia, Hungary, Latvia, Lithuania, Poland and Slovakia. The territorial restrictions prevented the import of gas at potentially more competitive prices. The restrictions also prevented gas from reaching areas of high demand and avoiding areas of excessive supply. Gazprom was also accused of compelling entities to consent to the now-defunct South Stream pipeline by necessitating a consent clause in long-term contracts.

In 2018, Gazprom agreed to a settlement that involved dropping all contractual barriers to the free flow of gas in Central and Eastern European gas markets and taking various steps to improve economic cooperation. Customers would be given an explicit contractual right to trigger a price review when prices paid diverged from competitive price benchmarks, and be allowed more frequent and efficient price reviews. Gazprom agreed not to seek any damages from its Bulgarian partners following the termination of the South Stream project. Had the case gone to court, the company could have been forced to pay fines of up to $12 billion.

In 2020, Gazprom agreed to reimburse Poland's PGNiG close to $1.5 billion for years of compelling it to overpay for its gas supply.

=== Methane leaks ===
In June 2021, a massive methane plume over Russia resulted from the partial shutdown of a Gazprom PJSC pipeline for emergency repair. The company stated that the repairs, which took place on 4 June, released 2.7 million cubic meters (1,830 metric tons) of methane. That amount has roughly the same short-term planet-warming impact as 40,000 internal-combustion cars in the U.S. driving for a year, according to the Environmental Defense Fund. The climate-warming effect of methane is estimated to be 86 times more potent than that of carbon dioxide.

=== Nord Stream pipelines ===
Nord Stream is a system of offshore natural gas pipelines in Europe, running under the Baltic Sea from Russia to Germany. The pipelines are owned and operated by subsidiaries of Gazprom. The Nord Stream projects have been fiercely opposed by the United States and Ukraine, as well as by other Central and Eastern European countries, because of concerns that the pipelines would increase Russia's influence in Europe, and because of the knock-on reduction of transit fees for use of the existing pipelines in Central and Eastern European countries. German chancellor Olaf Scholz suspended certification of Nord Stream 2 on 22 February 2022 because Vladimir Putin led Russia to recognize the Donetsk and Luhansk regions of Ukraine as independent republics. On 2 March 2022, it was reported that Nord Stream 2 AG, a Gazprom subsidiary, had ended business operations and laid off all 106 members of its staff as a result of international sanctions, though earlier reports that it had filed for bankruptcy were denied.

On 26 September 2022, a severe drop in pressure in both NS1 and NS2 was associated with a rupture in both pipes due to sabotage.

=== Greenpeace protest against Arctic drilling ===
Gazprom's oil drilling in the Arctic has drawn protests from environmental groups, particularly Greenpeace. Greenpeace has opposed oil drilling in the Arctic because it believes that oil drilling damages the Arctic ecosystem and that there are no safety plans in place to prevent oil spills.

In August 2012, Greenpeace staged protests against the Prirazlomnaya oil platform, the world's first offshore Arctic drill site. On 18 September 2013, the Greenpeace vessel MV Arctic Sunrise staged a protest and attempted to board Gazprom's Prirazlomnaya oil platform. Greenpeace stated that the drill site could cause massive disruption to the Arctic ecosystem. After arresting two campaigners attempting to climb the rig, the Russian Coast Guard seized control of the Greenpeace ship by dropping down from a helicopter and arresting thirty Greenpeace activists. Arctic Sunrise was towed by the Russian Coast Guard to Murmansk.

The Russian government intended to charge the Greenpeace campaigners with piracy and hooliganism, which carried a maximum penalty of fifteen years imprisonment. Greenpeace argued their operatives were in international waters. The Russian government's actions generated protests from governments and environmentalists worldwide. According to Phil Radford, Executive Director of Greenpeace in the US at the time, the reaction of the Russian Coast Guard and the courts were the "stiffest response that Greenpeace has encountered from a government since the bombing of the Rainbow Warrior in 1985." The charges of piracy were dropped in October 2013. In November 2013, 27 of the 30 activists were released on bail.

In May 2014, the first shipment of Arctic oil arrived at a refinery in the Netherlands and was purchased by the French company, TotalEnergies.

The episode is portrayed in the 3-hour television documentary On Thin Ice: Putin v Greenpeace.

=== Sanctions ===
Following Russia's continued aggression towards Ukraine, the US tightened its debt financing restrictions on Gazprombank on 17 July 2014. On 12 September 2014, the United States barred U.S. persons from selling goods and services to Gazprom and Gazprom Neft in connection with certain deepwater, Arctic offshore and shale projects. On 31 July 2014, the EU placed financial restrictions on Gazprombank. On 8 September 2014, the EU placed financial restrictions on Gazprom Neft.

In April 2018, the United States placed CEO Alexey Miller among the Specially Designated Nationals. This sanction bars U.S. individuals and entities from having any dealings with him. Entities outside the U.S. jurisdiction may also face punishment if the U.S. government deems they are aiding a sanctioned entity. Miller himself claimed to be proud of the sanction: "Not being included in the first list I even had some doubts – may be something is wrong (with me)? But I am finally included. This means that we are doing everything right," Miller said through his spokesman.

In December 2019, the U.S. sanctioned firms involved in the Nord Stream 2 project.

On 24 February 2022, upon the 2022 Russian invasion of Ukraine, the U.S. expanded penalties on Nord Stream 2 AG, a subsidiary of Gazprom, and sanctioned its CEO Matthias Warnig. It also expanded debt and equity prohibitions against Gazprombank, Gazprom, and Gazprom Neft. In addition, following the invasion, in March 2022 the European Union formally approved a ban on investments in the Russian energy sector, including Gazprom Neft.

The UK banned Gazprom from its debt and equity markets on 2 March 2022, sanctioned Gazprombank on 24 March 2022, and Gazprom board members on 1 March 2023. Gazprom Energy, a UK firm, stated that "supplies 20.8% of non-domestic gas volume in Great Britain. We source our gas through commodity exchanges in exactly the same way as our competitors and we do not depend on gas supplies from Russia."

Effect of sanctions

In 2022, due to economic sanctions, Gazprom took the unprecedented step of suspending dividends for the first time since 1998.

On 18 July 2022, amid the Nord Stream 1 maintenance period, Gazprom sent a letter declaring force majeure, claiming that due to extraordinary circumstances it could not guarantee a gas supply. On 26 September 2022, a rupture occurred in both pipes due to sabotage.

In the first half of 2022, Gazprom reported high profits, roughly equal to the profit for the whole of 2021, due to high prices. In the second half of 2022 and into 2023, Gazprom likely did not make a profit at all due to falling exports. Overall, Gazprom made a profit of 1.226 trillion roubles ($15.77 billion) in 2022, down 40%, after an extra tax was levied in late 2022.

On 19 December 2022 the European Energy ministers agreed on a price cap for natural Gas at €180 per megawatt-hour aiming to stop Russia forcing European gas prices upwards.

Exports of gas by Gazprom from Russia in 2021 was 185Bcm, in 2022 it fell by 45% to 100Bcm and in 2023 it fell again to 62Bcm.

=== State owned military company ===
In February 2023 Russian prime minister Mikhail Mishustin signed an order giving Gazprom Neft the right to form its own military company.

=== Reducing and ceasing supplies to gas companies ===
After the February 2022 invasion of Ukraine and the West's introduction of sanctions, Western gas companies continued to pay, normally Gazprom Bank accounts in euros and dollars, which meant that the funds became blocked by sanctions. On 31 March, President Vladimir Putin signed a decree − decree 172, requiring payment to be made by alternate means. Many Western companies refused to pay except in accordance with their contracts; accordingly, Gazprom ceased supplying those companies. There had also been cases of short delivery by Gazprom. This created the 2022–2023 Russia–European Union gas dispute

Arbitration proceedings through the International Court of Arbitration have been initiated by many Western companies with long-term contracts, seeking damages due to short supply or cessation of supplies in breach of Gazprom's contractual obligations, including Germany's Uniper, which is claiming €11.6 billion in compensation from Gazprom and Engie which opened proceedings in February 2023 for insufficient gas deliveries.

Gazprom went to arbitration for €300m for unpaid gas from Gasum in Finland, which the arbitration decided was payable, but not in rubles.

India's GAIL is also seeking compensation through a London arbitration court over Gazprom's short delivery of LNG to India, which was disrupted by sanctions against a Gazprom subsidiary in Germany.

== See also ==
- Naftogaz
- CentGas consortium
- Gazpromavia airline
- Fakel - military wing of Gazprom Neft
- List of Russian companies
- Enerco Energy
- Lakhta Center
- Obskaya–Bovanenkovo Line
- Energy Triangle
- List of countries by natural gas production
- List of countries by natural gas exports
- List of countries by natural gas proven reserves
- 2022 Russian businessmen suspicious deaths

== Sources ==
- Goldmann, Marshall (2008), Petrostate: Putin, Power and the New Russia, Oxford University Press, ISBN 978-0-19-534073-0
- Gazprom in figures 2004-2008, Gazprom, 2008
