= Vyakhirev =

Vyakhirev or Viakhirev (Russian: Вяхирев) is a Russian masculine surname, its feminine counterpart is Vyakhireva or Viakhireva. It may refer to

- Anna Vyakhireva (born 1995), Russian handball player
- Polina Kuznetsova (born Vyakhireva in 1987), Russian handball player, sister of Anna
- Rem Viakhirev (1934–2013), Russian businessman
