= Alexey Miller =

Russian businessman (born 1962)

- Алексей Миллер
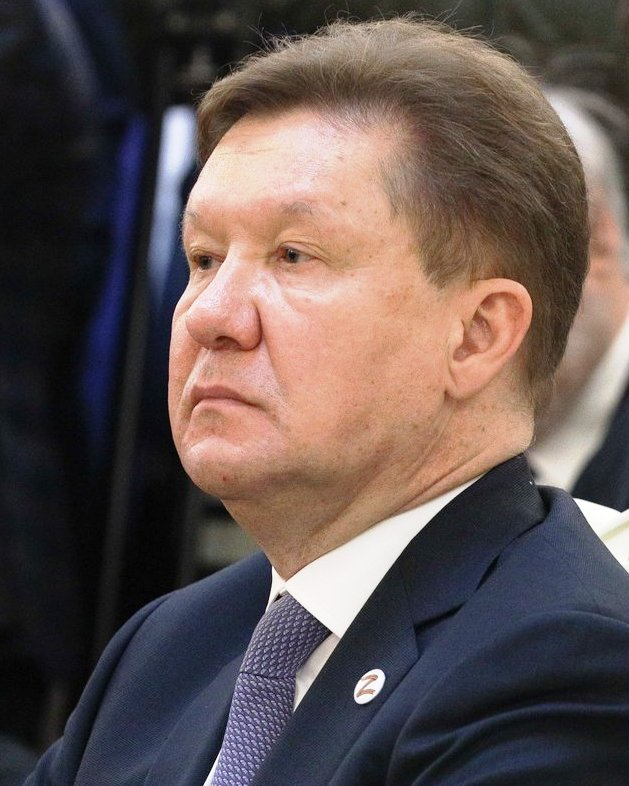
- Miller in 2022
- Born: Alexey Borisovich Miller; 31 January 1962 (age 64); Leningrad, Russian SFSR, Soviet Union (now Saint Petersburg, Russia)
- Occupations: Chairman of the management committee, Gazprom
- Predecessor: Rem Viakhirev (CEO of Gazprom)

Alexey Borisovich Miller (Russian: Алексе́й Бори́сович Ми́ллер; born 31 January 1962) is a Russian businessman. Miller is the Deputy Chairman of the Board of Directors and the Chairman of the Management Committee (CEO) of Russian energy company Gazprom, Russia's largest state-owned company and the world's biggest public energy supplier. He is a Russia German by nationality.

== Early life ==
Miller was born in Leningrad to an assimilated Russo-German family. He studied at the Leningrad Institute of Finance and Economics from which he received a PhD in economics.

== Career ==
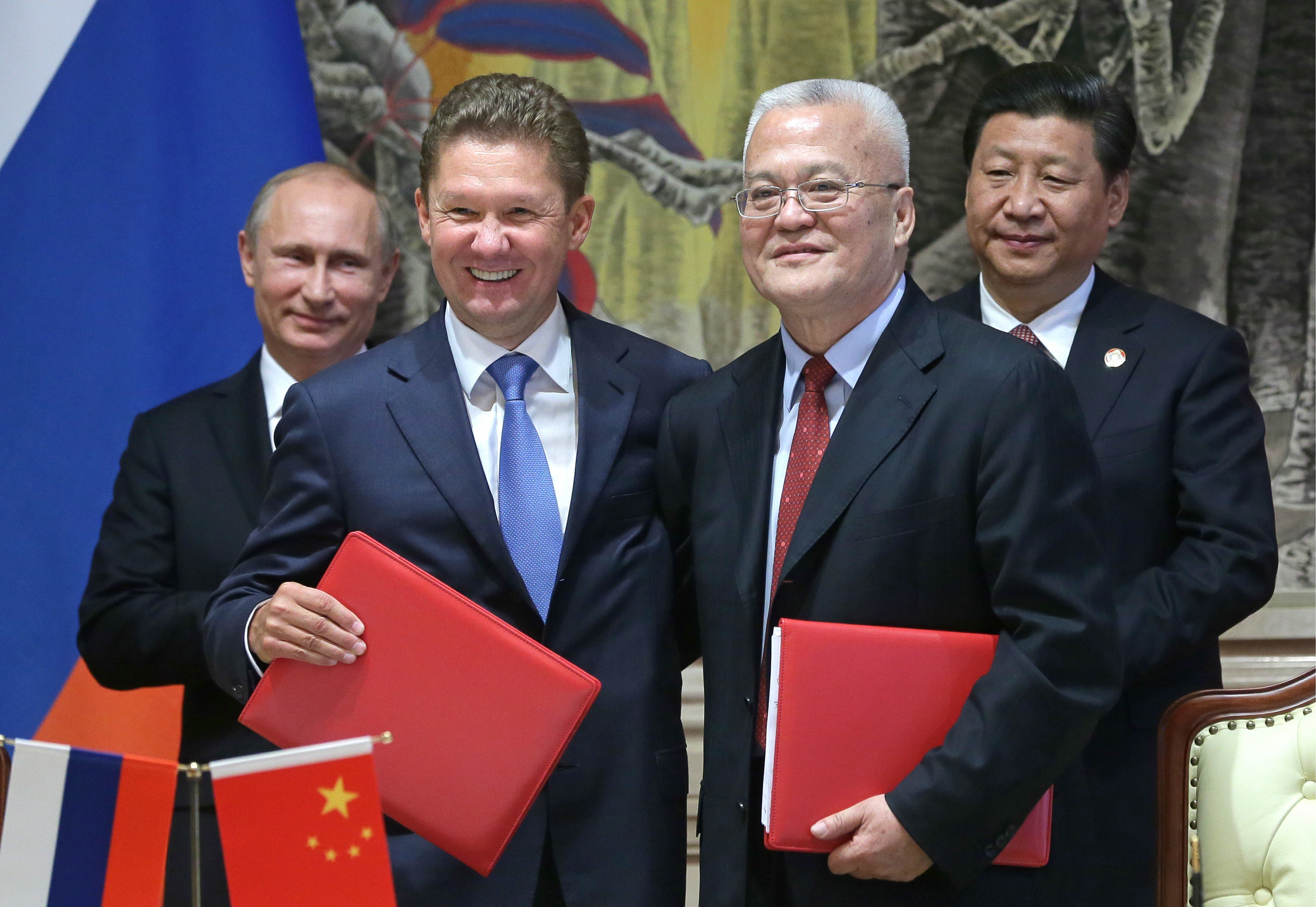
Alexey Miller and Head of the China National Petroleum Company Zhou Jiping signed a $400 billion gas deal for natural gas supplies via the Eastern Route between Gazprom and CNPC, 21 May 2014

Miller’s first role was as an engineer-economist in the general planning division of the Leningrad research institute of civil construction ‘LenNIIProekt’.

In 1990, he briefly became a junior researcher at the Leningrad Finance and Economics Institute and also became section head for the Economic Reform Committee at the Executive Committee of the Leningrad City Council.

From 1991 to 1996, Miller served with the Committee for External Relations of the Saint Petersburg Mayor's Office under Vladimir Putin. During this time, he was head of the markets monitoring division at the Foreign Economic Relations Directorate and was also deputy chairman of the External Relations Committee.

From 1996 to 1999, he was Director for Development and Investments of the Port of Saint Petersburg. From 1999 to 2000, he served as Director General of the Baltic Pipeline System.

In 2000, he was appointed Deputy Minister of Energy of the Russian Federation, and since 2001 he has served as Chairman of the Management Committee of Gazprom. Since 2002, he has also been deputy chairman of Gazprom’s board of directors. Putin secured Miller’s appointment as CEO so that his former colleague could put an end to fears that some of Gazprom’s executives had harmful third-party relationships. It was also part of the move to centralize state-owned and private energy companies. This was a shift towards building large state companies as they are seen as the backbone of Russian economy.

=== Sanctions ===
In April 2018, the United States placed Miller on the list of Specially Designated Nationals (SDN) along with 23 other Russian nationals. The sanction bars U.S. individuals and entities from having any dealings with him.

Following Russia's 2022 invasion of Ukraine, Miller was sanctioned by the British government which involved freezing his assets and a travel ban.

== Awards and titles ==
Miller in meeting with President Vladimir Putin, 16 February 2018

In December 2005, Miller was named Person of the Year by Expert magazine, the influential Russian business weekly. He shared the title in 2005 with Dmitry Medvedev, Chairman of the board of Gazprom.

Miller is also a recipient of:

- Order for the Services to the Fatherland, I class (2017)
- Order for the Services to the Fatherland, IV Class (2006)
- Medal of the Order for the Services to the Fatherland, II Class;
- Order of Hero of Labour of the Russian Federation (2022);
- Order of the Hungarian Republic Cross, II Class, for the services in the energy cooperation sector;
- Order of St. Mesrop Mashtots (Armenia);
- Dostyk (Friendship) Order, II Class (Republic of Kazakhstan);

Preceded by Rem Viakhirev	CEO Gazprom; 30 May 2001–present	Incumbent
