= Alexander Ananenkov =

Russian businessman

Alexander Georgiyevich Ananenkov
- Александр Георгиевич Ананенков
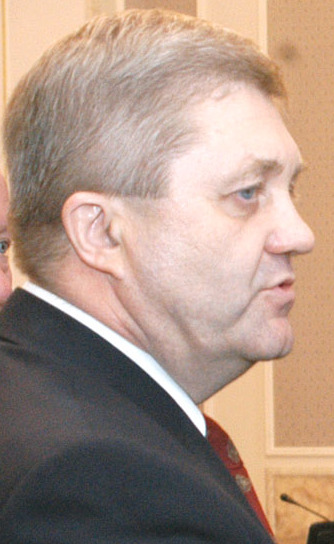
- Alexander Ananenkov in 2003
- Born: May 13, 1952 (age 73); Sterlitamak, Republic of Bashortostan, Russia

Alexander Georgiyevich Ananenkov (Russian: Александр Георгиевич Ананенков; born May 13, 1952 in Sterlitamak, Bashkir ASSR, Russian SFSR, Soviet Union) is a Russian businessman.

For ten years between 2001 and 2011 he was a deputy head of the management committee of Gazprom for production. as well as a shareholder of the Russian natural gas company.

On December 30, 2011, Ananenkov was dismissed by Gazprom and replaced by Vitaly Markelov.

== Gallery ==
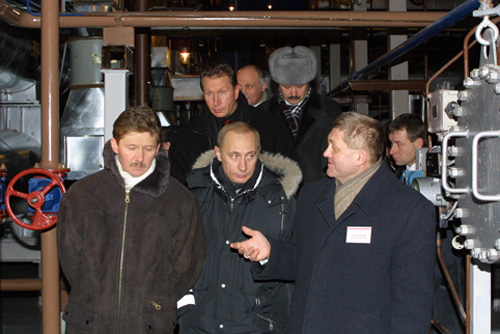
President Vladimir Putin with Chairman of the Gazprom Management Board Alexei Miller (left) and CEO of Yamburggazdobycha Alexander Georgievich Ananenkov (right) during a visit to the Zapolyarnoye gas field (Novy Urengoy, Yamalo-Nenets Autonomous Okrug)

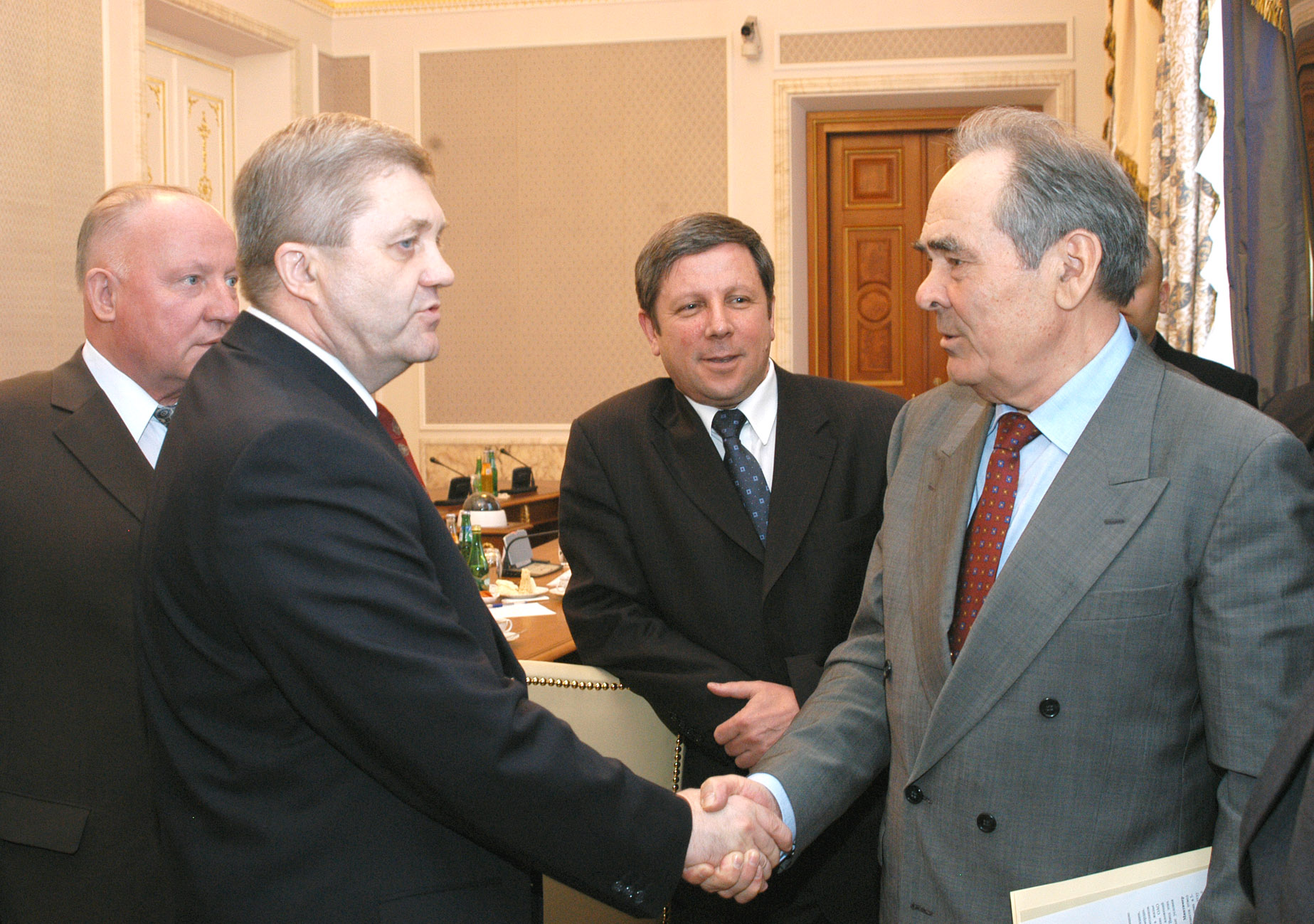
With Mintimer Shaimiev in 2003

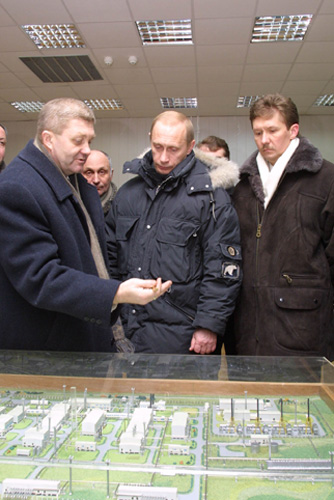
With Vladimir Putin in 2001
