= Unified Gas Supply System =

The Unified Gas Supply System (Russian: Единая система газоснабжения) is a unique technological complex that includes gas production, processing, transportation, storage and distribution facilities in the European part of Russia and Western Siberia. The Unified Gas Supply System ensures a continuous gas supply cycle from the well to the end consumer. It was mainly created during the Soviet era. It is the world's largest system for transporting and balancing natural gas supplies. The owner of the Russian segment of the Unified Gas Supply System is Gazprom. Gazprom also owns gas transportation networks in Armenia, Kyrgyzstan, and Belarus.

== History ==
The project for the creation of the Unified Gas Supply System was prepared by the Ministry of Gas Industry of the Soviet Union from October 1961 to March 1963, under the leadership of the minister Aleksei Kortunov. In 2017, the total volume of gas transported through the Unified Gas Supply System amounted to 672.1 billion cubic meters, including 20.8 billion cubic meters from Central Asia. Deliveries outside Russia amounted to 232.4 billion cubic meters. In 2017, Gazprom provided gas transportation services via the gas transportation system in the Russian Federation to 24 companies. The transportation volume amounted to 137.9 billion cubic meters of gas. In August 2023, Gazprom began design and survey work for further design of the construction of a 700-kilometer gas pipeline from the Volodino compressor station in Tomsk Oblast to Krasnoyarsk. According to Deputy Prime Minister Alexander Novak, this will be the first stage in the development of the Unified Gas Supply System in Eastern Siberia. Upon completion of the design work, it is planned to sign a gasification program between Gazprom and Krasnoyarsk Krai so that the first consumers will receive gas by the 400th anniversary of the region's capital.
