= Rosneftegaz =

Russian oil and gas holding company

- Native name: AO «Роснефтегаз»
- Company type: Public
- Industry: Oil and gas
- Founded: 2004; 22 years ago
- Founder: Technopromexport
- Headquarters: Moscow, Russia
- Area served: Russia
- Key people: Gennady Bukayev (CEO)
- Revenue: ▲US$3.95 billion (2013)
- Net income: ▲US$2.75 billion (2014)
- Owner: Russian government, via the Federal Agency for State Property Management
- Number of employees: 10 (2014)

Rosneftegaz is a Russian holding company managing assets in the oil and gas industry. It owns a controlling stake in Rosneft, 10.97% of the shares of Gazprom, and 26.36% of the shares of Inter RAO.

100% of Rosneftegaz shares are owned by the state, represented by the Federal Agency for State Property Management.

== See also ==
- Petroleum industry in Russia
