= Sergei Ushakov =

Sergei Konstantinovich Ushakov was an advisor to the President of Russia.

He was born in Leningrad on June 23, 1952, and received a degree from the Leningrad State University in 1974. He spent the next 28 years in the security agencies, including the positions of deputy director of the Federal Protection Service. And First Deputy Director of the Federal Guard Service. He was also deputy chairman of the Board of Gazprom

In October 2007, he was appointed Advisor to the President and acting director of the committee for organizing Russia's chairmanship of the 2012 Asia-Pacific Economic Cooperation Forum. He was dismissed from his post by presidential decree in 2012.
