= Rem Viakhirev =

Russian businessman (1934–2013)

- Рем Иванович Вяхирев
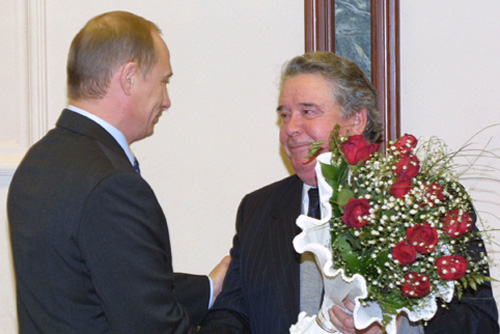
- Vyakhirev in 2001
- Born: Rem Ivanovich Viakhirev; August 23, 1934; Samara Oblast, Russian SFSR, Soviet Union
- Died: 11 February 2013 (aged 78); Moscow Oblast, Russia
- Education: Kuybishev Institute of Oil and Gas
- Occupation: CEO of Gazprom (1992–2001)
- Successor: Alexey Miller

Rem Ivanovich Viakhirev (or Vyakhirev; Russian: Рем Ива́нович Вя́хирев, IPA: [ˈrɛm ɨˈvanəvʲɪtɕ ˈvʲæxʲɪrʲɪf]; 23 August 1934 – 11 February 2013) was a Russian businessman. From 1992 to 2001, he was chairman of Gazprom. In May 2001, Viakhirev had to resign as chairman during Putin's consolidation of economic power. His successor was Alexey Miller.

== Biography ==
Vyakhirev was born on August 23, 1934, in the village of Great Chernigovka, Kuybyshev Oblast.

Between 1976 and 1978, he was director of Orenburg Gazdobycha Company. Between 1978 and 1982, he was the Chief Engineer of " Orenburg Gazprom.

Between 1983 and 1985, he was Deputy Minister of Gas Industry of the USSR and the Chairman of Tyumen Gazprom company. In 1986, he became the First Deputy Minister of Gas Industry of the Soviet Union.

In 1989, he was appointed as chairman of Gazprom concern. From 1992 to 2001, he was the Gazprom CEO.

Since May 1996, he was the chairman of Siberian Oil Company. Since 1994, he was a member of the Governmental Council for Industry policy and business. Between 1994 and 1995, he was chairman of Imperia Bank. Since 1995, he was member of Board of directors of the Russian Public Television.

Between 2001 and 2002, he was the chairman of the Russian Oil Company (RGO). Viakhrev died in Moscow on February 11, 2013 at the age of 78.

== Personal life ==
Viakhirev was married. He had a son Yuri (Russian: Юрий Вяхирев), daughter, grandson and two granddaughters.

Preceded by none	CEO Gazprom; 1992–2001	Succeeded by Alexei Miller
