= Hydrocarbon economy =

Hydrocarbon economy is a term referencing the global hydrocarbon industry and its relationship to world markets. Energy used mostly comes from three hydrocarbons: petroleum, coal, and natural gas. Hydrocarbon economy is often used when talking about possible alternatives like the hydrogen economy.

== History ==
The history of hydrocarbon economies intertwines with the Industrial Revolution and the discovery of oil. Key historical moments include the rise of the petroleum industry in the late 19th century, the geopolitics of oil in the 20th century, and the emergence of OPEC. The control and access to oil have been pivotal in world events, including wars and economic crises.

=== Origins and early development ===
The origins and early development of hydrocarbon economies have significantly shaped global politics, economics, and technological advancements, emphasizing the crucial role of hydrocarbons in both economic and political spheres, as well as the strategic importance of oil in international and national contexts.

The inception of the modern petroleum industry can be traced back to the late 19th century with Edwin Drake's pioneering drilling of the first commercial oil well in Titusville, Pennsylvania in 1859. This event marked the beginning of the oil boom in the United States and laid the foundation for future developments in the industry. Further solidifying the U.S.'s stature in the global oil market was the discovery of the Spindletop gusher in Texas in 1901, which catalyzed a significant increase in oil exploration and production.

During the First and Second World Wars, oil played an indispensable role, being essential for powering military vehicles and ships. The strategic value of oil resources became increasingly apparent, influencing military strategies and outcomes in both conflicts. The formation of the Organization of Petroleum Exporting Countries (OPEC) in 1960 marked a pivotal shift in the control of oil resources, transferring significant influence from Western oil companies to the oil-producing nations and thus altering the global oil landscape. The oil crises of the 1970s were turning points in the history of hydrocarbon economies. The 1973 oil crisis, triggered by an embargo by Arab oil producers, led to a drastic spike in oil prices and posed considerable economic challenges for oil-importing nations. This was followed by the 1979 energy crisis, caused by the Iranian Revolution, which again resulted in a major increase in oil prices and global economic difficulties.

The Gulf War in 1990-1991, instigated by Iraq's invasion of Kuwait, was largely driven by oil-related interests. This conflict had significant implications for the oil market, particularly concerning the security of oil supplies from the Persian Gulf. In the 21st century, the rise of hydraulic fracturing, or fracking, especially in the United States, has led to a substantial increase in oil and natural gas production. This development has reshaped global energy markets and has been instrumental in reducing the U.S.'s reliance on imported oil.

== Hydrocarbon price volatility ==
Hydrocarbon price volatility, particularly in the context of hydrocarbon economies, is a complex phenomenon impacted by a confluence of geopolitical, economic, and market factors. The period between 2010 and 2014, where hydrocarbon prices hovered around USD 100 per barrel, followed by a dramatic decline in 2016 to about USD 30 per barrel, exemplifies this volatility.

This fluctuation in hydrocarbon prices can be attributed to several interconnected factors. During this period, there was a notable oversupply in the global oil market. This was largely driven by increased production, especially with the United States ramping up its shale oil output, leading to a surplus. Concurrently, the Organization of the Petroleum Exporting Countries (OPEC), which has a history of adjusting production to influence prices, decided to maintain high production levels. This strategy, diverging from OPEC's usual approach of production cuts to stabilize prices, contributed further to the oversupply.

Global economic conditions also played a significant role. For example, a slowdown in economic growth in major economies, such as China, led to reduced demand for oil. When combined with an oversupplied market, these factors contributed to the significant drop in oil prices. The impact of such volatility is particularly pronounced in economies heavily reliant on hydrocarbon revenues. Sharp decreases in oil prices can lead to reduced national incomes, impacting government budgets and economic stability. This unpredictability underscores the risks associated with dependency on hydrocarbons, whose prices are subject to global economic forces and political dynamics.

Consequently, there has been an increasing emphasis on the need for these hydrocarbon-dependent countries to diversify their economies. Economic diversification is seen as a way to mitigate the risks associated with hydrocarbon price volatility. By developing other sectors such as technology, manufacturing, or tourism, countries can create a more balanced and resilient economic structure. This diversification is crucial not only for stabilizing national incomes but also for ensuring long-term economic sustainability in the face of fluctuating global oil prices.

== Hydrocarbon resources ==
Hydrocarbon resources (HCR), particularly coal, oil, and natural gas, play a crucial role in the global economy. Significant technological transformations in the oil and coal industries are taking place due to the "greening" of global economies. This shift is expected to alter the role of hydrocarbons, possibly leading to their partial substitution with alternative energy technologies.

Challenges in the oil industry include the lack of international regulation, depletion of easy-to-recover reserves, low oil recovery rates, insufficient investments in innovative technologies, and the absence of universally accepted indicators for sustainable development. In contrast, the gas sector, especially the production of liquefied natural gas (LNG), is experiencing robust growth. Natural gas is often regarded for its cost-effectiveness and comparatively lower carbon dioxide emissions during electricity generation, particularly when juxtaposed with coal. Reflecting this, the Liquefied Natural Gas (LNG) industry has witnessed a doubling of its capacities every decade since 1998, with projections indicating a continuing trend of rising demand and supply, though the potential for an oversupply exists. In this landscape, Russia has emerged as a notable player in the LNG market, strategically targeting regions such as Europe, Asia, and the Arctic. The "Nord Stream 2" and "Turkish Stream" projects, along with Russia's LNG production, are seen as complementary rather than competitive, creating favorable conditions for Russia's gas in the European market. Russia's extensive program aims to increase LNG production capacity, positioning it as a key player in the global LNG industry. The Arctic, despite its challenges, is considered a potential source for ensuring the stability of gas monetization schemes, contributing to market growth and facilitating the development of the Northern Sea Route.

== Applications and usage ==
Hydrocarbons are pivotal in various sectors. In transportation, they fuel vehicles, ships, and planes. In the industrial sector, they are used as raw materials for plastics, chemicals, and pharmaceuticals. In the energy sector, they are critical for electricity generation and heating. In hydrocarbon economies, the transportation sector is heavily reliant on hydrocarbons, mainly petroleum products like gasoline and diesel. These fuels power a vast array of vehicles – cars, buses, trucks, ships, and airplanes – making them indispensable for facilitating global trade and personal mobility. The dominance of hydrocarbons in transportation is not only due to their energy density and efficiency but also due to the extensive infrastructure developed around their extraction, refining, and distribution. This sector's dependence on hydrocarbons significantly contributes to the economic strength and development of hydrocarbon-based economies. Hydrocarbons play a critical role in the industrial sector, serving as essential raw materials for a wide range of products. Key among these are plastics, which find use in an array of applications from packaging to high-tech devices. The pharmaceutical industry also heavily relies on hydrocarbons for the production of various medicines and medical equipment. Furthermore, hydrocarbons are fundamental in the manufacture of a variety of chemicals, impacting numerous industries. The industrial utilization of hydrocarbons is indicative of their economic importance, driving innovation and supporting a multitude of manufacturing processes in hydrocarbon economies. In the energy sector, hydrocarbons are a primary source of electricity generation globally. While coal, a type of hydrocarbon, has historically dominated power generation, natural gas is increasingly favored due to its cleaner-burning properties. Beyond electricity, hydrocarbons are critical for heating purposes, whether in industrial processes or residential settings. The efficiency and availability of hydrocarbons make them a preferred choice for energy production, underpinning the energy security and economic stability of hydrocarbon-dependent economies. The sector's reliance on hydrocarbons underscores their vital role in maintaining energy supplies and supporting economic activities.

== Production and reserves ==
The discussion of production and reserves underpins the entire economic structure of hydrocarbon economies. Worldwide, major oil and natural gas reserves are unevenly distributed, with significant concentrations in certain regions, notably the Middle East, North America, Russia, and parts of Africa. The Middle East, known for its vast oil reserves, remains a focal point in global oil markets. Countries like Saudi Arabia, Iraq, and Iran possess some of the largest proven oil reserves in the world, making the region pivotal in terms of global supply. The economic and political dynamics of these countries are deeply intertwined with their oil production capabilities and policies. In North America, particularly the United States and Canada, the oil and gas industry has undergone significant transformation with the advent of new extraction technologies. The development and implementation of hydraulic fracturing, or fracking, has unlocked vast reserves of shale oil and gas, reshaping the production landscape in the region. This technological advancement has not only boosted domestic oil and gas production but also altered the global energy market by reducing North America's dependence on imported oil. Russia, another major player in the global hydrocarbon market, has extensive oil and natural gas reserves, particularly in Siberia and the Arctic. The country's economy is heavily reliant on the export of these resources, making its production strategies and capabilities crucial both domestically and internationally. Parts of Africa, including Nigeria, Angola, and Libya, are significant oil producers as well. The exploration and production activities in these countries contribute substantially to their national incomes, although they often grapple with challenges such as political instability and infrastructure constraints. Advancements in extraction technologies, notably offshore drilling, have also played a key role in expanding production capabilities. Offshore drilling has opened up new reserves in deep-sea locations, previously inaccessible or uneconomical to explore. This technology has enabled countries with offshore reserves to tap into these resources, contributing to the diversification of global oil and gas supply sources. The production and reserves of oil and natural gas are fundamental aspects of hydrocarbon economies, influencing not only the economic health of producing countries but also global energy dynamics. The distribution of these reserves and the adoption of advanced extraction technologies like fracking and offshore drilling continue to reshape the landscape of global hydrocarbon production.

== Impact of hydrocarbon economy ==
The hydrocarbon industry also plays a crucial role in job creation and economic development. For example, in the United States, each land rig employs on average twenty-two people directly, and each drilling job leads to the creation of three additional jobs in the economy. T his multiplier effect signifies the vast economic impact of the hydrocarbon sector. In 2012, the industry supported 2.1 million jobs and contributed almost $284 billion to the American gross domestic product. The industry's impact extends through the midstream and downstream sectors. Pipeline construction alone employed over 135,000 people in 2015, highlighting the extensive workforce involved in transporting crude oil and natural gas. Downstream activities, including refining and distribution, contributed to over 68,000 jobs.The industry's impact is not limited to jobs and revenue. The industry not only provides employment but also contributes significantly to tax revenues and fees in states like Colorado. Millions of dollars in tax and land lease revenues from oil and gas activities flow into local communities, enhancing education, improving roads, and supporting infrastructure development.

== Transportation and infrastructure ==
Hydrocarbon economies are heavily reliant on an extensive and complex infrastructure that encompasses the entire chain from extraction to distribution. Pipelines play a critical role in this network, serving as the arteries that transport oil and natural gas from production sites to refineries and storage facilities. They are the most efficient means for overland transportation of these resources, especially over long distances, forming an interconnected web that spans continents. In addition to pipelines, the transportation of oil and gas across oceans relies heavily on tankers and strategic shipping routes. These tankers, varying in size from small vessels to ultra-large crude carriers, navigate through key maritime chokepoints like the Strait of Hormuz, the Suez Canal, and the Panama Canal. The Strait of Hormuz, for example, is particularly notable for its strategic importance, as a significant proportion of the world's oil trade passes through this narrow passage.

Refineries are another crucial component, where the crude oil undergoes processing to be converted into various usable products such as gasoline, diesel, and jet fuel. These facilities are often strategically located near major consumption areas or ports to optimize the distribution of refined products. Lastly, storage facilities are integral to the hydrocarbon infrastructure, providing the capability to stockpile resources. This is vital for managing the supply to meet fluctuating demands and ensuring availability during periods of supply disruption. These facilities vary in form, including large tank farms and underground storage, and are positioned strategically to maintain a balance between supply, demand, and logistical requirements. This comprehensive infrastructure is not only a logistical necessity for hydrocarbon economies but also represents a significant strategic asset. Control over key elements of this infrastructure, such as pipelines and shipping routes, holds considerable geopolitical significance. Disruptions in this network, whether due to political conflict, technical failures, or natural disasters, can have profound impacts on global energy supply and market stability. The intricate network of transportation and infrastructure thus forms the backbone of the global hydrocarbon economy, connecting production centers with markets worldwide and ensuring the steady flow of energy resources.

== Economic aspects ==
The economic impact of hydrocarbon economies is immense, profoundly influencing global markets and geopolitical dynamics. The prices of oil and gas, key commodities in these economies, are crucial determinants in the global market. Their fluctuations can have a ripple effect, impacting inflation rates, economic growth, and the overall health of both consumer and producer nations. High oil prices generally lead to increased costs for a wide array of products and services, affecting consumers and businesses globally. On the other hand, low oil prices, while beneficial for consumers, can pose significant challenges for countries that heavily rely on hydrocarbon exports for their fiscal revenues. These countries often face budget deficits and economic instability when prices plummet.

Moreover, hydrocarbon resources play a central role in shaping geopolitical relationships. Countries with rich hydrocarbon reserves often hold substantial geopolitical influence, which is evident in international alliances and conflicts centered around energy security. This dynamic is particularly noticeable in organizations like OPEC, where member states collaborate to manage oil supply and influence global prices. The decisions and policies of such organizations can have wide-reaching effects, extending beyond the energy sector to influence global politics and economics.

Countries heavily dependent on hydrocarbon exports encounter unique economic challenges. The concentration on the lucrative hydrocarbon sector often leads to a lack of diversification in their economies, making them vulnerable to external market shocks. This situation is commonly referred to as the "resource curse" or "Dutch disease," where the prosperity brought by natural resource wealth paradoxically undermines the development of a diversified economic base. Additionally, these economies face the challenge of transitioning to more sustainable energy sources in response to global climate change concerns. As the world gradually shifts towards renewable energy, hydrocarbon-dependent countries are tasked with diversifying their economic structures and investing in new sectors to ensure long-term economic stability and growth. In summary, hydrocarbon economies wield significant influence over global economic and political landscapes. The intricate relationship between hydrocarbon prices, global markets, and geopolitical dynamics, coupled with the inherent challenges faced by hydrocarbon-dependent nations, underscores the complex and pivotal role these economies play in the broader global context.

== Environmental impact and climate change ==
This section would address the environmental challenges of hydrocarbon economies, focusing on pollution, greenhouse gas emissions, and their contribution to global warming. It would also discuss the societal impacts and global initiatives for environmental protection.

=== Hydrocarbon resources and climate change ===
Climate change, a global concern, is partly attributed to the significant increase in technogenic greenhouse gas emissions, particularly CO_{2}. According to the International Energy Agency (IEA), the peak CO_{2} emissions in 2019, reaching 33 Gt, are largely a result of HCR use. Studies also highlight indirect losses associated with HCR, including land use for power plants and potential geopolitical conflicts. Despite debates on the primary drivers of climate change, the undeniable link between HCR and CO_{2} emissions underscores the need for a careful examination of the environmental impact and the development of strategies to improve the industry's environmental safety.

=== Hydrocarbon resources and alternative energy technologies ===
As the world navigates a transition to alternative energy technologies, hydrocarbon resources (HCR) play a central role in the discourse. The nuclear energy sector, contributing 4.5% to the global energy balance, faces challenges such as accidents and concerns about nuclear weapons development. Meanwhile, renewable energy sources (RES) present promise but encounter issues like non-uniform geographical distribution and technology immaturity. Hydrogen technologies, seen as a potential solution, face hurdles due to the high cost of production and the absence of market mechanisms. The text emphasizes the need for a balanced approach, urging consideration of the environmental and economic aspects while acknowledging the indispensable role HCR continue to play in the global energy landscape.

== Challenges and future outlook ==
The future of hydrocarbon economies faces several challenges, including resource depletion, environmental concerns, and the shift to sustainable energy sources. This section would speculate on potential developments and the changing landscape of global energy.

=== Innovation in hydrocarbon economy ===
Innovation and technology are essential for transforming hydrocarbon-based economies. The growing rate of innovation and its transformative has a huge impact on various sectors. An innovative hydrocarbon economy focuses on resource optimization, extraction efficiency, environmental stewardship, and fostering collaboration and partnerships for knowledge exchange and technological advancements.

=== Shift from resource dependency to knowledge dependency ===
The transformation from resource-dependent to knowledge-dependent countries has become imperative for hydrocarbon economies. Nations such as Norway, Brazil, and the United Arab Emirates are already pioneering this shift. The 2020 International Monetary Fund (IMF) Report reinforces the idea that a nation's economic standing is intrinsically tied to the development and utilization of its knowledge domain. This shift is not merely a trend but a strategic response to reduce dependence on natural resources.
