= Energy in Belarus =

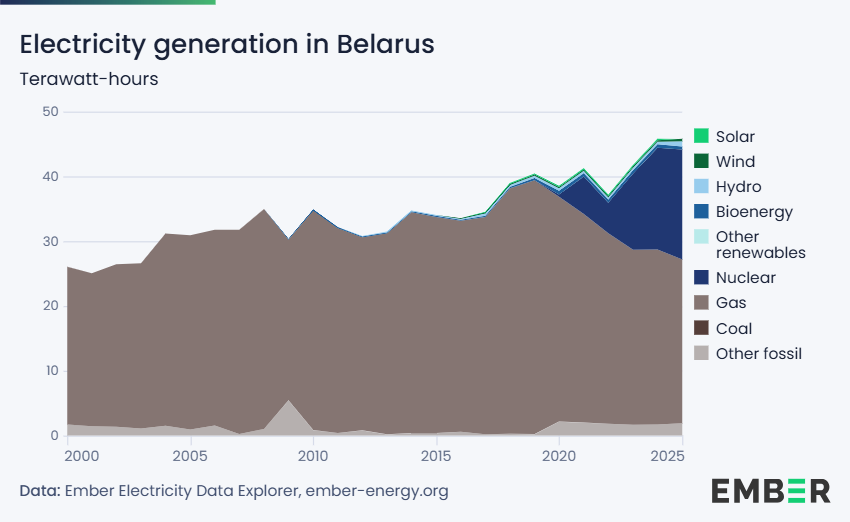
Electricity generation in Belarus in terawatt-hours

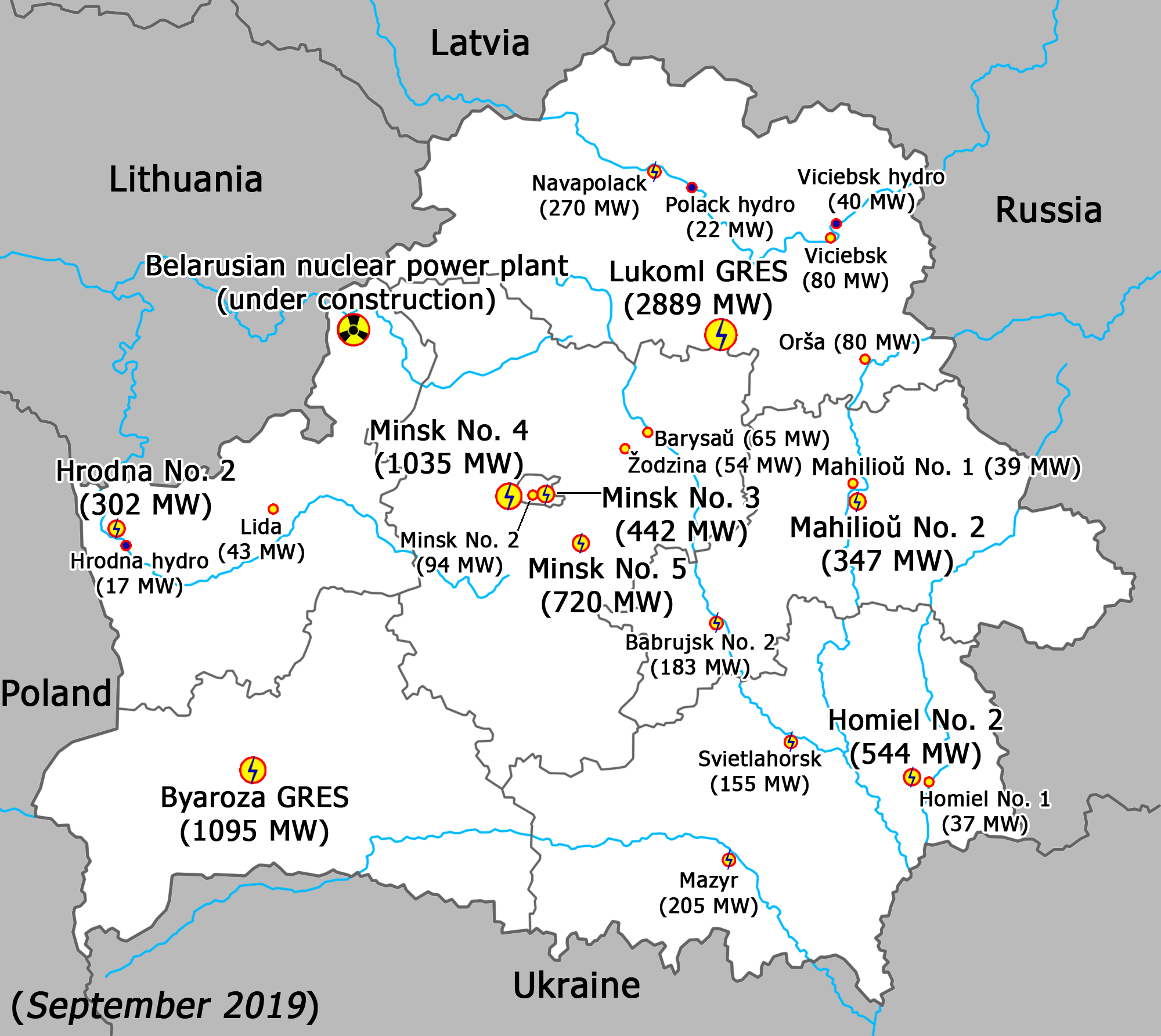
Map of power plants

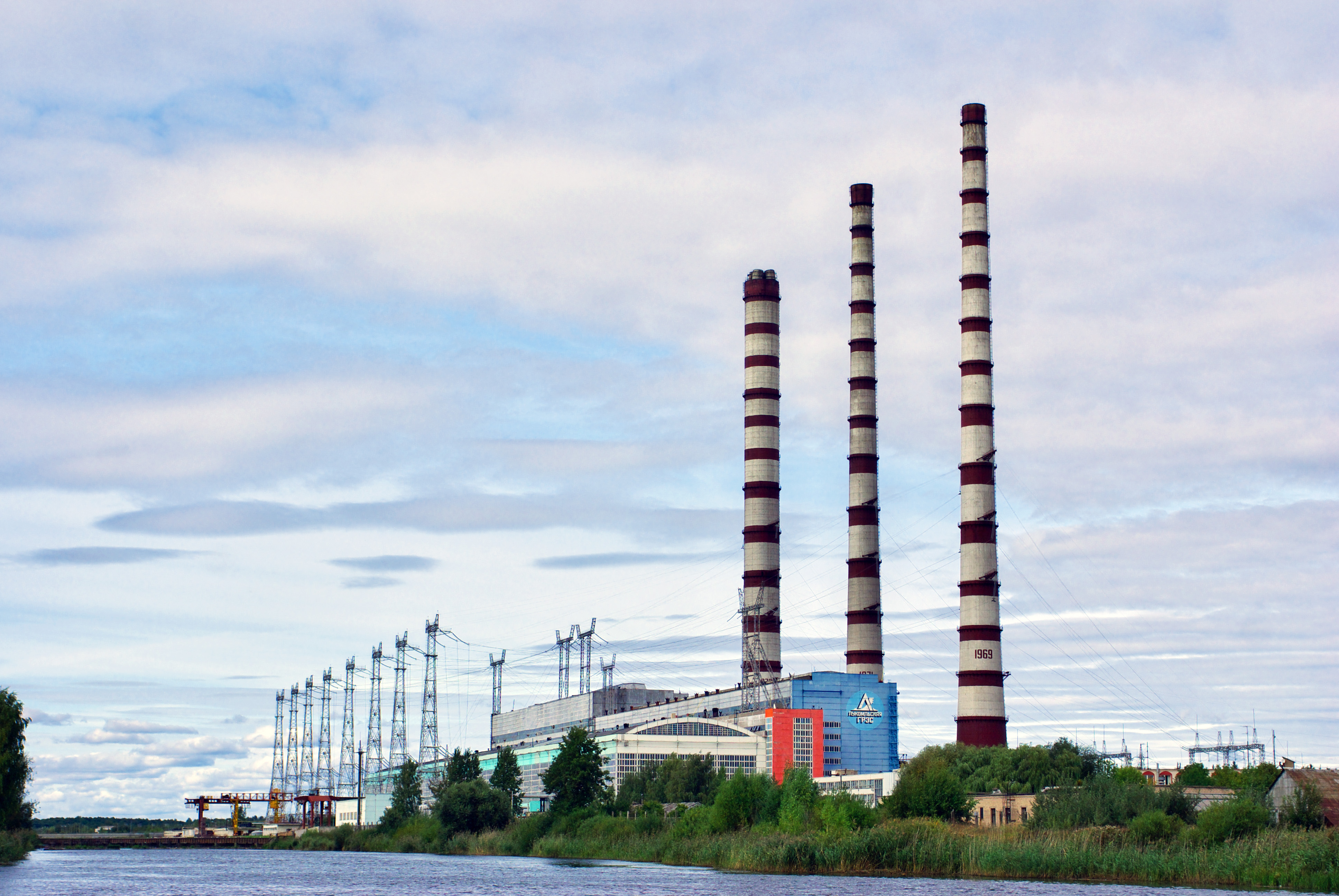
Lukoml power station

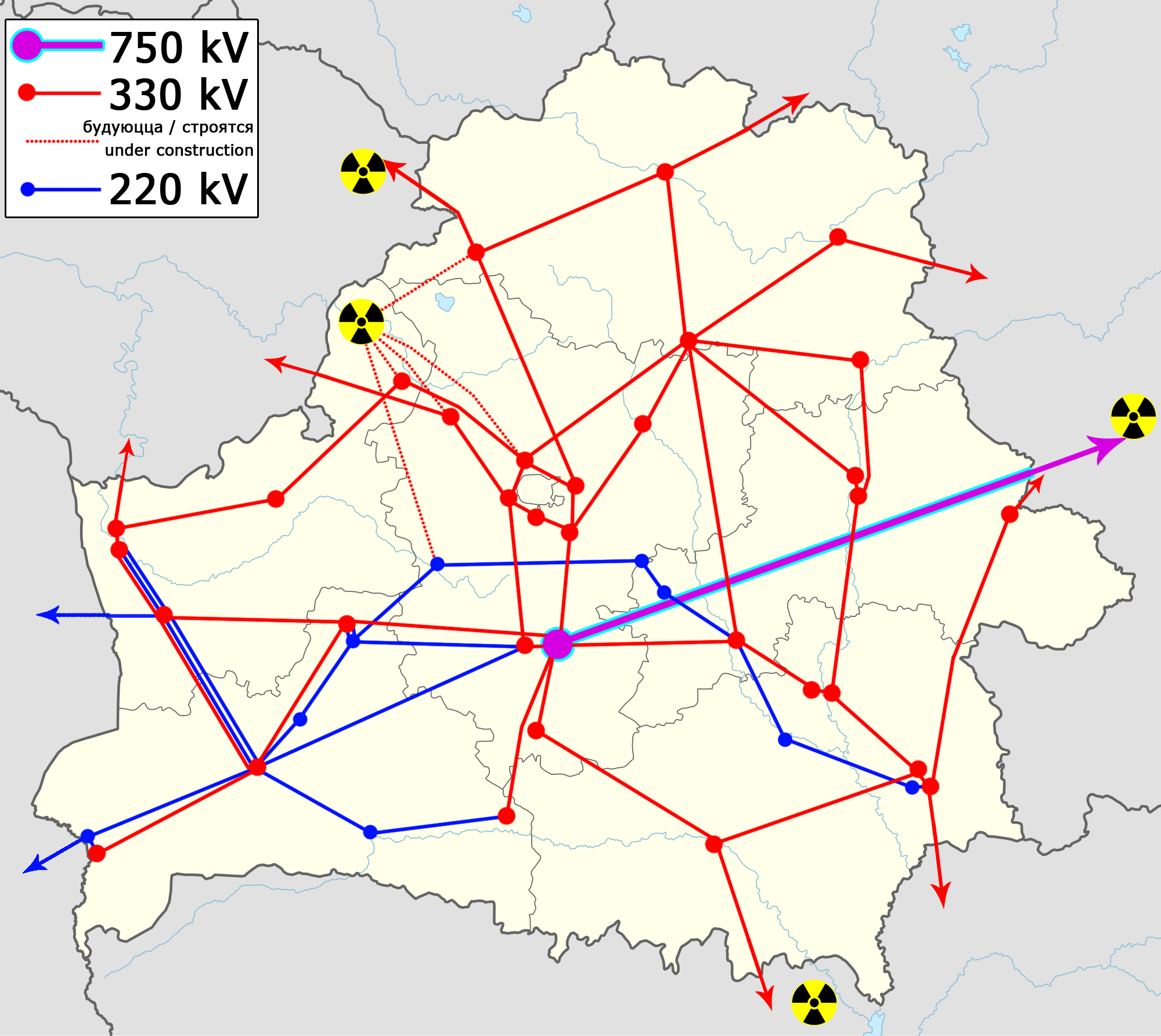
Power lines (220, 330 и 750 kv) in Belarus

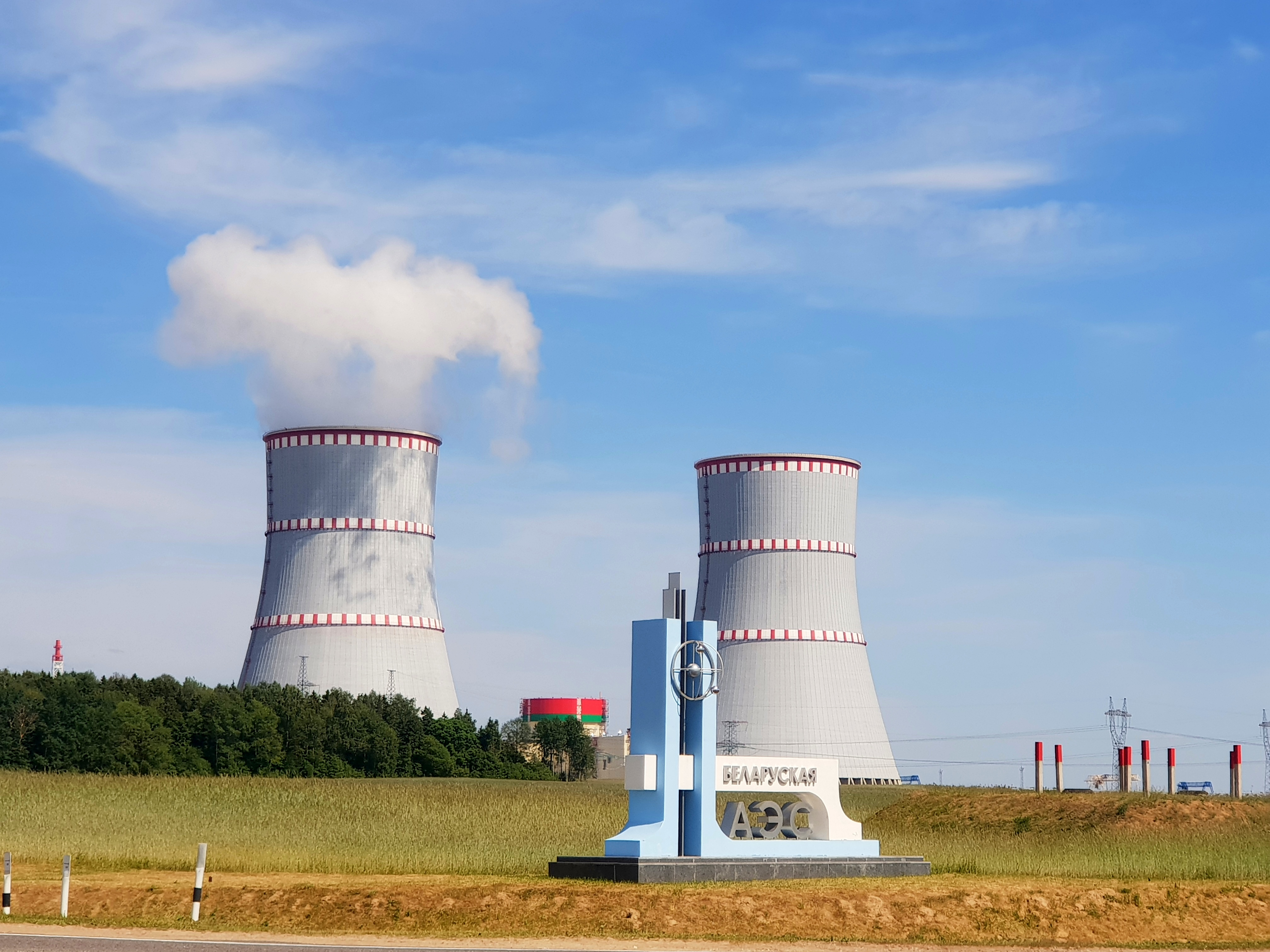
Astravets Nuclear Power Plant in 2023

Most energy in Belarus is cheap fossil gas from Russia, and Belarus is a net energy importer. According to IEA, the energy import vastly exceeded the energy production in 2015, describing Belarus as one of the world's least energy sufficient countries in the world. Belarus imports oil from Russia, and sends back some refined products such as gasoline.

Total energy consumption (measured by total primary energy supply) in Belarus was 27.0 Mtoe in 2018, similar to consumption in Norway and Hungary. Primary energy use in Belarus was 327 TWh or 34 TWh per million persons in 2008.

Primary energy use per capita in Belarus in 2009 (34 MWh) was slightly more than in Portugal (26 MWh) and about half of the use in Belgium (64 MWh) or Sweden (62 MWh).

Electricity consumed in 2021 was 32.67 billion kWh, 3,547 kWh per capita.

== Overview ==
Energy in Belarus
	Population (million)	Total energy supply (TWh)	Production (TWh)	Net Import (TWh)	Electricity (TWh)	CO_{2}-emission (Mt)
1990	10.19	518.8	39.5	489.7	44.6	99.8
1991	10.19	504.3	41.1	464.8	44.8	96.2
1992	10.22	423.6	41.4	381.5	40.0	86.8
1993	10.24	360.5	38.2	322.3	35.3	75.4
1994	10.23	307.7	40.9	264.2	31.4	64.0
1995	10.19	281.1	39.4	251.2	28.4	56.9
1996	10.16	287.6	39.7	247.0	28.5	57.8
1997	10.12	287.9	39.7	261.1	29.9	58.2
1998	10.07	279.0	38.4	249.7	30.4	56.3
1999	10.03	275.0	42.1	237.8	30.1	54.1
2000	9.98	279.7	41.0	245.2	29.9	52.1
2001	9.93	279.9	42.3	244.8	29.9	50.9
2002	9.87	287.2	43.3	247.8	29.6	50.8
2003	9.80	295.4	41.9	257.6	30.0	51.4
2004	9.73	309.1	42.4	270.5	30.9	54.5
2005	9.66	308.1	44.6	266.5	31.4	55.0
2006	9.60	327.9	45.6	286.5	32.3	57.2
2007	9.56	321.0	46.4	275.6	32.4	55.7
2008	9.53	323.9	46.1	285.8	33.2	58.4
2009	9.51	303.8	45.7	257.5	31.4	55.3
2010	9.48	316.7	47.0	271.4	33.8	59.5
2011	9.46	333.5	48.7	285.3	34.4	56.4
2012	9.45	346.1	48.3	308.6	35.0	57.5
2013	9.44	308.9	46.4	273.4	34.5	57.5
2014	9.45	317.9	43.1	282.0	34.9	56.8
2015	9.46	290.1	41.7	248.7	33.8	52.6
2016	9.47	287.6	42.5	242.1	33.7	53.0
2017	9.46	293.6	46.1	251.5	34.2	54.0
2018	9.44	313.8	48.2	269.1	35.2	57.1
2019	9.42	303.5	50.8	256.8	35.4	55.4
2020	9.38	292.2	51.7	244.6	35.3	52.5
2021	9.30	317.2	70.2	248.1	38.1	53.1
2022	9.21	307.9	71.9	236.8	36.0	50.5
Change 1990-2022	-9.6%	-40.6%	82.0%	-51.6%	-19.3%	-49.4%

== Power plants ==
Name	Region/city	Capacity, MW
Lukoml GRES	Vitebsk Region	2,889
Byaroza GRES	Brest Region	1,095
Minsk thermal No. 4	Minsk city	1,035
Minsk thermal No. 5	Minsk Region	719.6
Gomel thermal No. 2	Gomel city	544
Minsk thermal No. 3	Minsk city	442
Mogilev thermal No. 2	Mogilev city	347
Grodno thermal No. 2	Grodno city	302.5
Novopolotsk thermal	Novopolotsk city	270
Mazyr thermal	Mazyr city	205
Babruysk thermal No. 2	Babruysk city	182.6
Svietlahorsk thermal	Svietlahorsk city	155
Minsk thermal No. 2	Minsk city	94
Viciebsk thermal	Vitebsk city	80
Orsha thermal	Orsha city	79.8
Barysaw thermal	Barysaw city	65
Zhodzina thermal	Zhodzina city	54
Lida thermal	Lida city	43
Vitebsk hydro	Vitebsk Region	40
Mogilev thermal No. 1	Mogilev city	38.5
Gomel thermal No. 1	Gomel city	37.3
Zhlobin thermal	Zhlobin city	26.2
Pinsk thermal	Pinsk city	22
Polotsk hydro	Vitebsk Region	21.7
Mogilev thermal No. 3	Mogilev city	19.5
Baranavichy thermal	Baranavichy city	18
Grodno hydro	Grodno Region	17
Brest thermal	Brest city	12
Babruysk thermal No. 1	Babruysk city	12

The Astravets Nuclear Power Plant became operational in 2020. In 2024, it produced 15.7 TWh of electricity generating up to 40% of the country's supply.

== Natural gas ==
The country is one of the world’s largest importers of natural gas with estimates for 2018 being about 17 Mtoe (20 billion cubic metres [bcm]) of natural gas, making it the leading importer among the so-called EU4Energy countries: Armenia, Azerbaijan, Belarus, Georgia, Kazakhstan, Kyrgyzstan, Moldova, Tajikistan, Turkmenistan, Ukraine and Uzbekistan. In 2018 almost all generated electricity came from natural gas (97%, or 39 terawatt hours [TWh]). In 1990, the IEA reported natural gas as constituting 52% of electricity generation, with oil generating 48%.

There are two large gas pipes running through Belarus, the Yamal–Europe pipeline and Northern Lights. In addition there is the Minsk–Kaliningrad Interconnection that connects to Kaliningrad.

In 2021 18.64 billion m3 were consumed with 0.06 billion produced, the rest imported.

== Oil ==
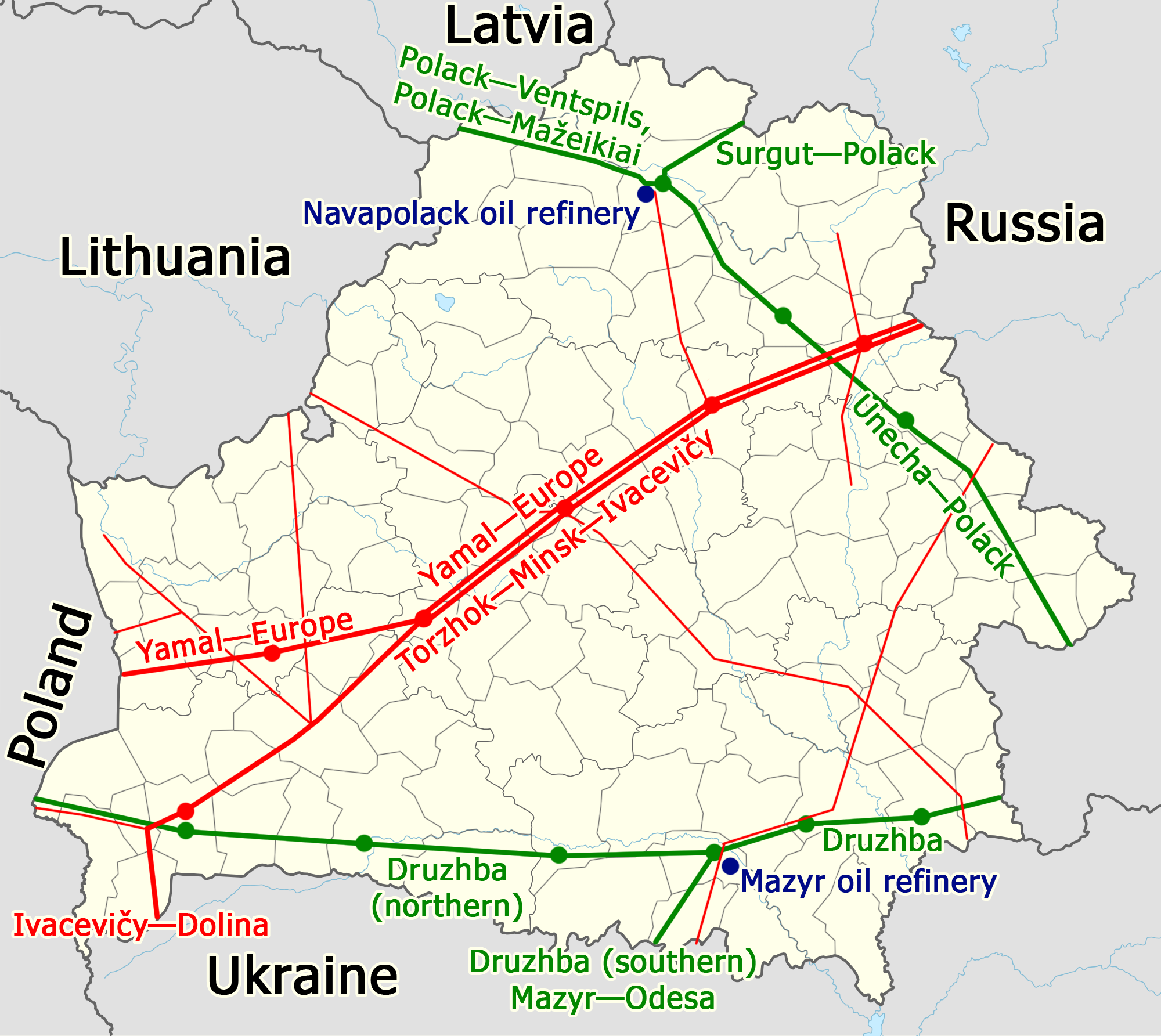
Oil refineries, oil and gas pipelines in Belarus

Belarus is a large oil refiner, listed 36th in the world, at 19 Mt of oil products in 2018 by the IEA. It has two refineries and oil pipelines built during the Soviet era including the Mozyr Oil Refinery.

Oil consumed in 2021 amounted to 49.13m barrels with 12.52 m barrels produced, the rest imported.

== Renewable energy ==
Renewable energy generation accounted for 6% of Belarus’s energy in 2018, rising to 8% in 2020, mostly from biofuels and waste. Renewables share in electricity generation was 2% in 2018 (0.8 TWh).

Years in which the last three renewable power levels achieved
Achievement	Year	Achievement	Year	Achievement	Year
4%	1999	6%	2001	8%	2020

Renewable energy includes wind, solar, biomass and geothermal energy sources.

== Storage ==
Because non-nuclear thermal power plants are ramped up and down depending on heat requirements, and nuclear is not very flexible, increased battery storage has been suggested.

== Subsidies ==
Fossil fuelled heat is heavily subsidized.

== See also ==
- Map of Belarusian power grids
- Druzhba pipeline
- 2004 Russia–Belarus gas dispute
- 2007 Russia–Belarus energy dispute
