= Gazprom pipeline =

Gazprom pipeline may refer to any of the gas pipelines owned, operated, built or planned by Gazprom.

- Altai gas pipeline
- Blue Stream
- Burgas–Alexandroupoli pipeline
- Central Asia–Center gas pipeline system
- Dzuarikau–Tskhinvali pipeline
- Gryazovets–Vyborg gas pipeline
- Mozdok–Makhachkala–Kazi Magomed pipeline
- NEL pipeline
- Nord Stream 1
- Nord Stream 2
- Northern Lights (pipeline)
- OPAL pipeline
- Pakistan Stream gas pipeline
- Power of Siberia
- Sakhalin–Khabarovsk–Vladivostok pipeline
- South Stream
- TurkStream
- Urengoy–Pomary–Uzhhorod pipeline
- Yamal–Europe pipeline
