= Trångsund (disambiguation) =

Trångsund is a part of Huddinge to the south of Stockholm, Sweden.

Trångsund may also refer to:

- Trångsund, Stockholm, a short, narrow street in Gamla stan, the old town of Stockholm, Sweden
- Vysotsk, (Russian: Высо́цк; Swedish: Trångsund), town and seaport in Vyborgsky District of Leningrad Oblast, Russia
  - Trångsund Fortress
