= Russia–Belarus energy dispute =

Russia–Belarus energy dispute may refer to:

- 2004 Russia–Belarus gas dispute
- 2007 Russia–Belarus energy dispute
