= Svistunovo =

Svistunovo (Russian: Свистуново) is the name of several rural localities in Russia.

- Svistunovo, Moscow Oblast, a village in Vozdvizhenskoye Rural Settlement of Klinsky District in Moscow Oblast
- Svistunovo, Rameshkovsky District, Tver Oblast, a village in Zastolbye Rural Settlement of Rameshkovsky District in Tver Oblast
- Svistunovo, Staritsky District, Tver Oblast, a village in Arkhangelskoye Rural Settlement of Staritsky District in Tver Oblast
- Svistunovo, Vologda Oblast, a village in Rostilovsky Selsoviet of Gryazovetsky District in Vologda Oblast
- Svistunovo, Yaroslavl Oblast, a village in Maryinsky Rural Okrug of Danilovsky District in Yaroslavl Oblast
