= Belarus–Russia relations =

- Belarus: Russia

Diplomatic mission
- Embassy of Belarus, Moscow: Embassy of Russia, Minsk

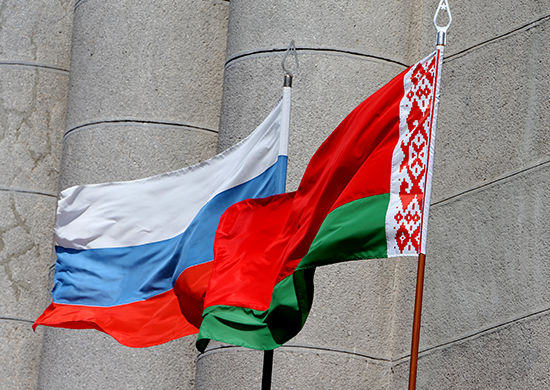
The flag of Russia (left) and flag of Belarus (right) flying together

Belarus and Russia share a land border and constitute the supranational Union State. Several treaties have been concluded between the two nations bilaterally. Russia is Belarus' largest and most important economic and political partner. Both are members of various international organisations, including the Commonwealth of Independent States, the Eurasian Economic Union, the Collective Security Treaty Organization, and the United Nations.

Belarus under Aleksander Lukashenko has been described by Western observers and pro-democracy activists in Belarus as being a client, (Note: Multiple sources:) puppet, (Note: Multiple sources:) satellite (Note: Multiple sources:) or vassal state (Note: Multiple sources:) of Russia under Vladimir Putin.

== History ==
=== Early 1990s ===
After the Soviet Union collapsed, the newly formed Russian state tried to maintain control over the post-Soviet space by creating, on 8 December 1991, a regional organization – the Commonwealth of Independent States (CIS). However, Belarus, as other republics in the CIS, started to drift away from Russia, which at that time was attempting to stabilize its broken economy and ties with the West.

In the early 1990s, Russia was concerned that its involvement in the near abroad states such as Belarus would risk the relations it was trying to build with the West. However, as NATO began to expand eastward, Russia found itself in a difficult situation. On one hand, it was facing a breakup of the large geopolitical bloc it had once controlled. On the other, it felt that the West was trying to isolate it from the European environment by picking up the pieces of its former empire. This led to the increasing importance of good relations with Belarus.

Flag of the Russian Soviet Federative Socialist Republic (1954–1991)

Flag of the Byelorussian Soviet Socialist Republic (1951–1991)

=== Middle and late 1990s ===
In the mid-1990s, and especially with Alexander Lukashenko coming to power in July 1994, Belarus seemed an ideal candidate for integration with Russia.

In order to implement the Treaty on the Creation of the Economic Union, Russia and Belarus concluded an agreement on a Belarus–Russia customs union on 6 January 1995. The parties stated that certain results have been achieved within the framework of the Agreement between the Government of the Russian Federation and the Government of the Republic of Belarus on the Unified Procedure for Regulation of Foreign Economic Activities signed on 12 April 1994 in Moscow. The agreement on a customs union between Russia and Belarus went into force on 30 November 1995. After that, customs and border controls were abolished. On 26 May 1995, Belarusian president Alexander Lukashenko and Russian prime minister Viktor Chernomyrdin dismantled the border post at the Belarus–Russia border.

Russian president Boris Yeltsin said, after signing the Treaty of Friendship, Good-Neighborliness and Cooperation with Belarus in February 1995, that "the two nations [had] shared a common historical experience over many centuries". That, he declared, had "created the basis for signing the treaty and other documents on deeper integration of our two countries. Among all CIS countries, Belarus has the greatest rights to such a relationship due to its geographical location, its contacts with Russia, our friendship and the progress of its reforms."

The integration process was launched on 2 April 1996 and exactly a year later, the Union of Belarus and Russia was founded. The culmination of this process was the establishment of the Union State between the Russian Federation and Belarus on 8 December 1999. The Treaty on Equal Rights of Citizens between Belarus and Russia was signed in December 1998, covering employment, and access to medical care and education.

=== 2000s ===
After Vladimir Putin took office he expressed deep dissatisfaction with the status of relations with Belarus and criticized the 1999 treaty, the policy he had set was to put real content into this treaty. His proposal was to continue in unification, either in a federation model with Belarus joining the Russian Federation, or to build a union similar to the European Union. However, Belarus refused and the status quo was maintained.

Despite that, the strategic value of Belarus seemed to continue to rise for Russia because of the international developments. These activities included the United States military activity in the post-Soviet space after the September 11 attacks in 2001, the eastern European states' shift towards the west, the plans to deploy NATO's missile defense system in Poland or the Czech Republic, and above all the rise of the colour revolutions. As a result, despite setbacks in political and economic integration, the military-integration processes between the two states continued.

As Russia realized that full integration with Belarus would be costly, it shifted its foreign policy towards a more pragmatic direction. Two major goals were distinguishable in this policy – the first was to reduce the economic burden that Belarus put on its economy, and the second was to take over the energy transit infrastructure in Belarus. These two goals have influenced most of the conflicts and Gas Wars between the two countries.

=== 2010s and the Russo-Ukrainian War ===
In 1995, the border between Russia and Belarus was abolished. In 2014, it was restored from the Belarusian side. In turn, Russia in February 2017 created a border zone on the part of the Smolensk oblast.

Since 2014, following years of embrace of Russian influence in the country, Lukashenko has pressed a revival of Belarusian identity after the start of the Russo-Ukrainian War: the Russian annexation of Crimea and military intervention in Eastern Ukraine. For the first time, he delivered a speech in Belarusian (rather than Russian, which most people use), in which he said, "We are not Russian – we are Belarusians", and later encouraged the use of Belarusian. Trade disputes, a border dispute, and a much relaxed official attitude to dissident voices are all part of a weakening of the longtime warm relationship with Russia.

On 14 September 2017 Belarusian and Russian relations were back to normal with the two conducting military drills.

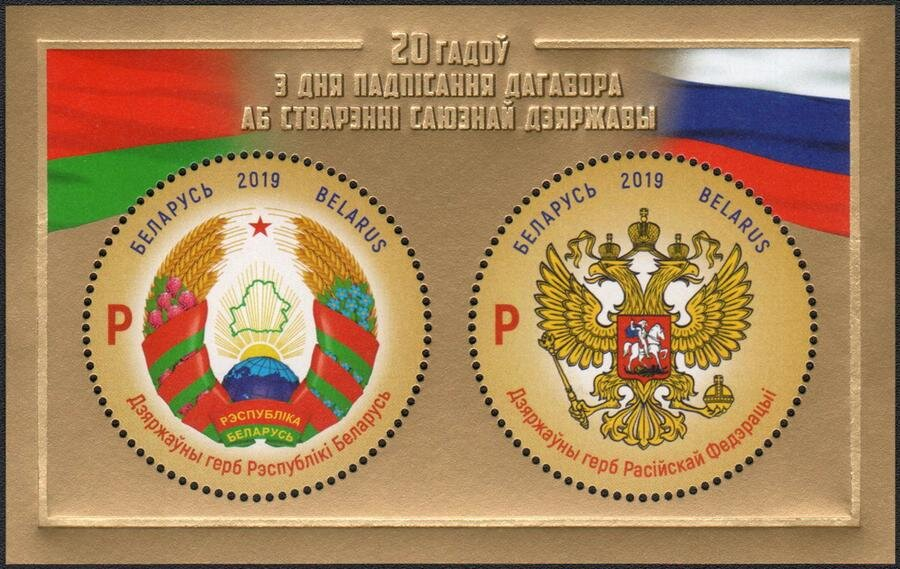
Stamp of 20th anniversary of Russia–Belarus Union Treaty

In 2019, Lukashenko had talks with Russian president Putin in Sochi and declared that their two countries "could unite tomorrow, no problem." An idea backed by Putin for years, observers labeled the potential plan a scheme by Putin to remain in power beyond 2024. However, political scientist Mikhail Vinogradov explained that "Lukashenko will play tough to the public while trying to look weak in front of Putin," and the Carnegie Moscow Center's Artyom Shraibman suggested that "Moscow will most likely fail to find its base among Belarusians."

=== 2020s: Strained relationship and reconciliation ===
On 24 January 2020, signs of new tensions between Belarus and Russia showed when Lukashenko publicly accused Putin of trying to incorporate Belarus into Russia. This led to Russia cutting economic subsidies for Belarus.

In July 2020, the relationship between Belarus and Russia was described as "strained" after 33 Russian military contractors were arrested in Minsk. Lukashenko afterwards accused Russia of trying to cover up an attempt to send 200 fighters from the private Russian military firm the Wagner Group into Belarus on a mission to destabilize the country ahead of its 9 August presidential election. On 5 August 2020, Russia's security chief Dmitry Medvedev warned Belarus to release the contractors. Lukashenko also claimed Russia was lying about its attempts to use the Wagner Group to influence the upcoming election.

Following the presidential election and eruption of new protests, Lukashenko mentioned by the end of August that Belarus would negotiate refinancing of its state debt worth $1bn with Russia. On 14 September, Lukashenko visited Putin in Sochi, where the latter promised to loan $1.5bn to Belarus.

In February 2022, Russian forces were permitted to stage part of the invasion of Ukraine from Belarusian territory. Lukashenko said that Belarusian troops could take part in the invasion if needed. Belarus also stated that Russia could bring its nuclear weapons onto Belarusian soil. In March 2022, Oleksandr Kamyshin, head of Ukrainian Railways, said there was no longer a railway connection between Ukraine and Belarus, so Russian equipment from Belarus would not be able to be delivered. On 25 March 2023, Russian president Putin announced that Russia would be stationing tactical nuclear operations in Belarus. On 12 August 2024, Lukashenko refuted the idea about unification with Russia, stating that any attempt to annex Belarus would result in war.

== Economic relations ==
As of 2009, Russia accounted for some 48% of Belarus' external trade. Belarus, in turn, accounted for around 6% of Russia's trade.

Before 2004, Gazprom sold gas to Belarus for Russian domestic prices, mainly due to the political integration process between the two countries. As this process started to falter in the 2000s and late 1990s, Gazprom wanted to ensure reliable transit of Russian gas through Belarusian territory by taking control of the Belarusian transit network. Gazprom tried to purchase the Belarusian network operator Beltransgaz, but disagreements over the price led to the 2004 Russia–Belarus gas dispute, in which Gazprom ceased supplies to Belarus on 1 January 2004.

A new gas contract was signed in June 2004, and relations between the two countries improved afterwards. In January 2020 Russia temporarily suspended its discounted sale of oil to Belarus, and later negotiated a compromise. Belarus diversified its oil imports in response, receiving oil from countries including Norway, Azerbaijan, Saudi Arabia, and the United States. Lukashenko accused Russia of using the oil as leverage to procure an eventual merger of Russia and Belarus.

=== Diplomatic tension ===
In 2009, a serious diplomatic row erupted between the two countries. President of Belarus Alexander Lukashenko accused Russia of offering a $500 million loan on the condition that Belarus recognize Abkhazia and South Ossetia, but added that the position of Belarus was not for sale. Lukashenko has declared that Belarusian citizens must abide by Georgian laws when traveling to the two regions, and the Foreign Ministry has stated that all Belarusian citizens must use points of entry on the Georgian side. Lukashenko declared that instead of Russia, Belarus should "look for happiness in other parts of the planet". Commenting on the close military cooperation between the two countries, Lukashenko likened Belarus' 10 million people as a human shield for Russia against the West, a service that he said "was not free".

In July 2009, the so-called Milk War erupted, when Russia banned all dairy imports from Belarus, saying that they did not comply with new regulations. Belarus accused Russia of employing the ban for political purposes, while Russia denied that the ban was political. Russia soon lifted the ban and Belarus resumed deliveries of dairy products to Russia.

However, a new dispute arose when Russia claimed that Belarus owed $231 million for gas supplies it had used since the start of the year. Belarus threatened to introduce Border and Customs control on its border with Russia, and refused to attend Collective Security Treaty Organization talks in Moscow. In an interview, President Lukashenko questioned the necessity of diplomatic relations with Russia, since Russia is "blockading" Belarus.

On 31 May 2012, Russian president Vladimir Putin was critical of the European Union's sanctions against Belarus, and in a joint statement Putin and Lukashenko said:

"Russia and Belarus will coordinate efforts to counter attempts to interfere in the internal affairs of the Union State and apply pressure through the introduction of restrictive measures or sanctions."

== Military cooperation ==
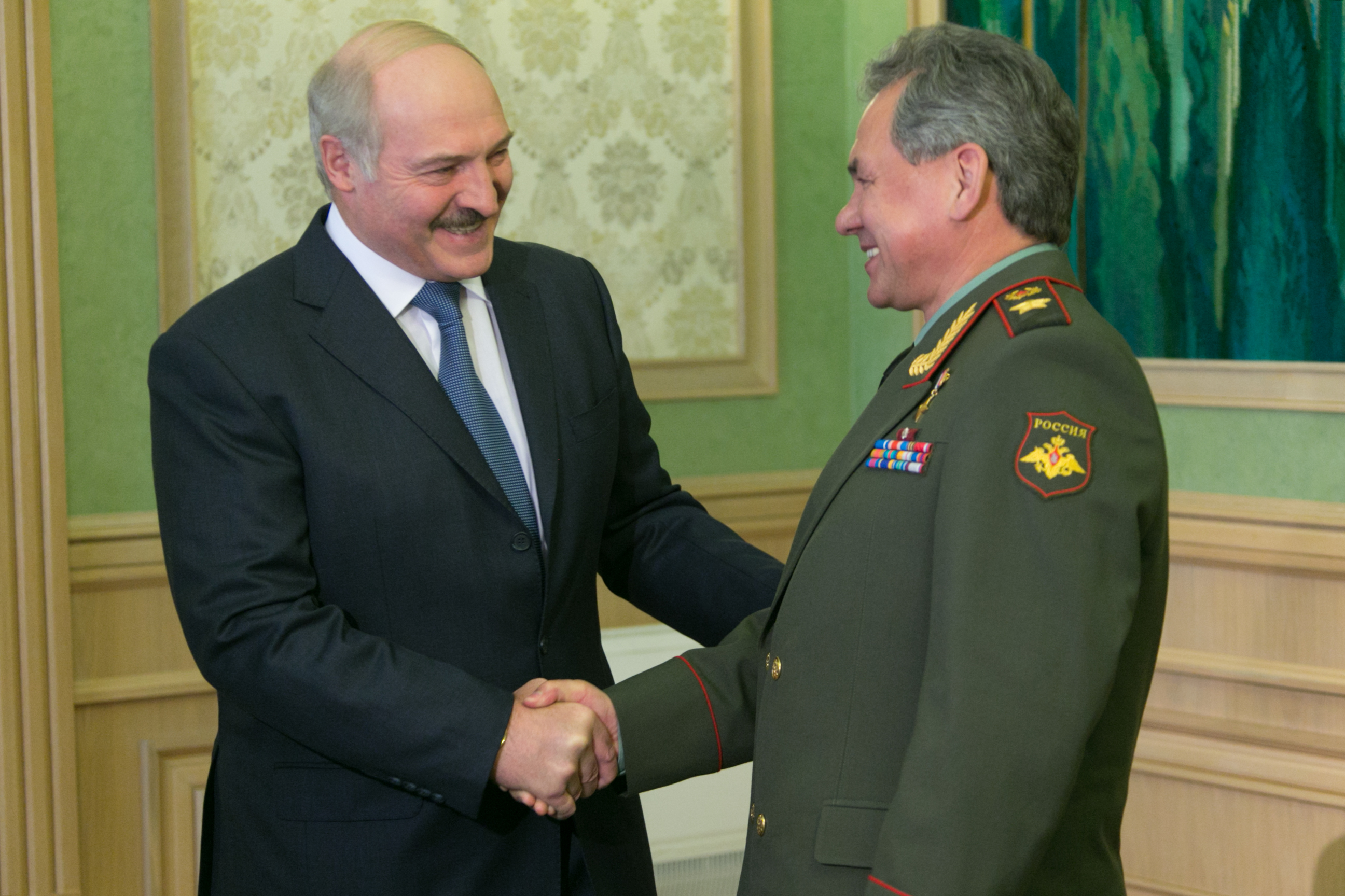
Alexander Lukashenko with Sergey Shoigu

Russia and Belarus have close military relations and are engaged in various joint military-scientific activities. Russia also operates several military bases and radars in Belarus which includes the Hantsavichy Radar Station an early warning radar which is run by the Russian Aerospace Defence Forces and the Vileyka VLF transmitter.

As result of the 2014 Ukraine crisis, Russia sought to replace Ukrainian defense ties with Belarus. On 14 September 2017, Belarusian and Russian relations were back to normal with both conducting military drills.

== Resident diplomatic missions ==
of Belarus in Russia

- Moscow (Embassy)
- Kaliningrad (Consulate-General)
- Kazan (Consulate-General)
- Nizhny Novgorod (Consulate-General)
- Novosibirsk (Consulate-General)
- Rostov-on-Don (Consulate-General)
- Saint Petersburg (Consulate-General)
- Ufa (Consulate-General)
- Vladivostok (Consulate-General)
- Yekaterinburg (Consulate-General)
- Krasnoyarsk (Embassy division office)
- Smolensk (Embassy division office)

of Russia in Belarus

- Minsk (Embassy)
- Brest (Consulate-General)
- Grodno (Consulate-General)

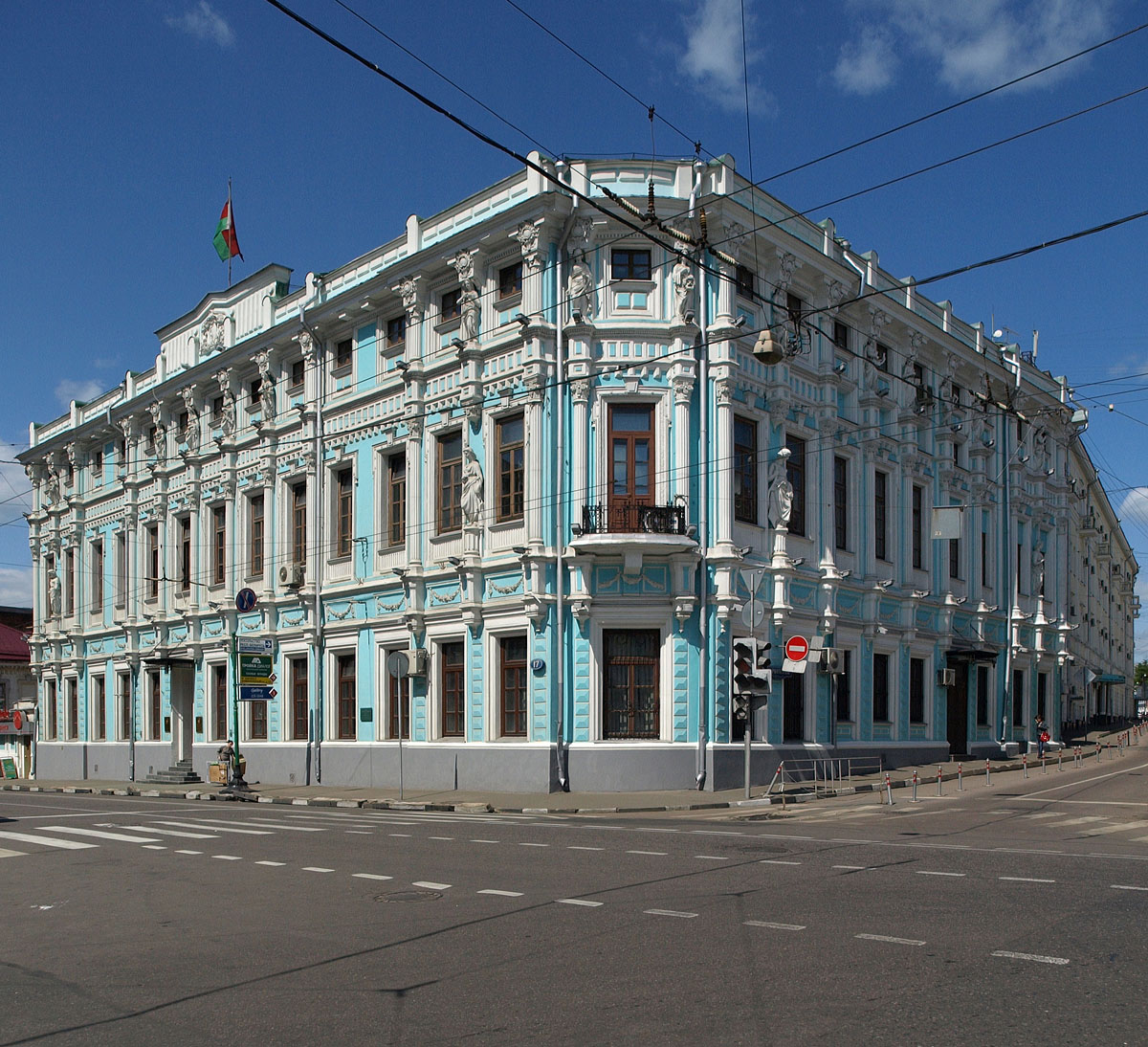
Embassy of Belarus in Moscow

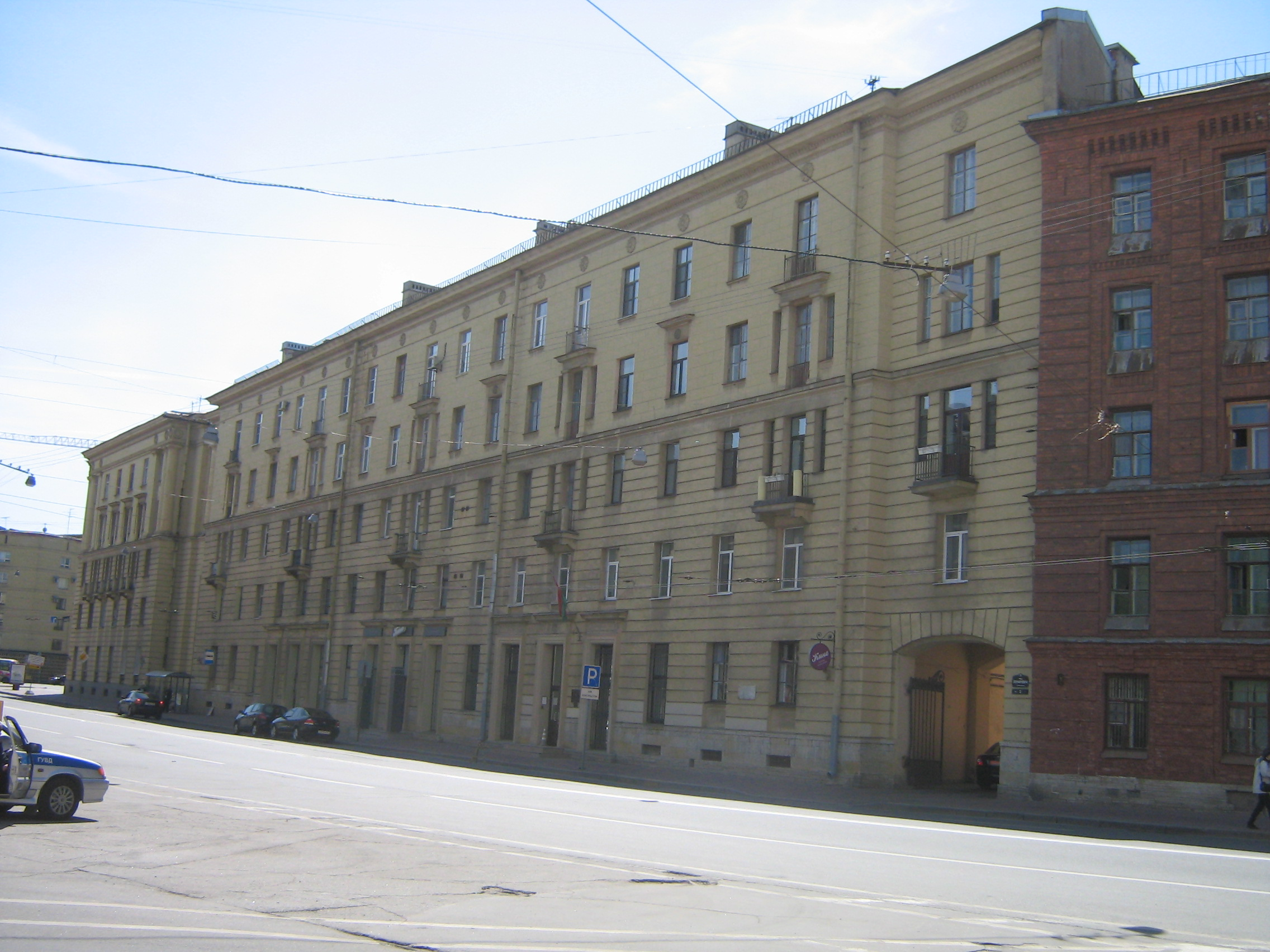
Consulate-General of Belarus in Saint Petersburg

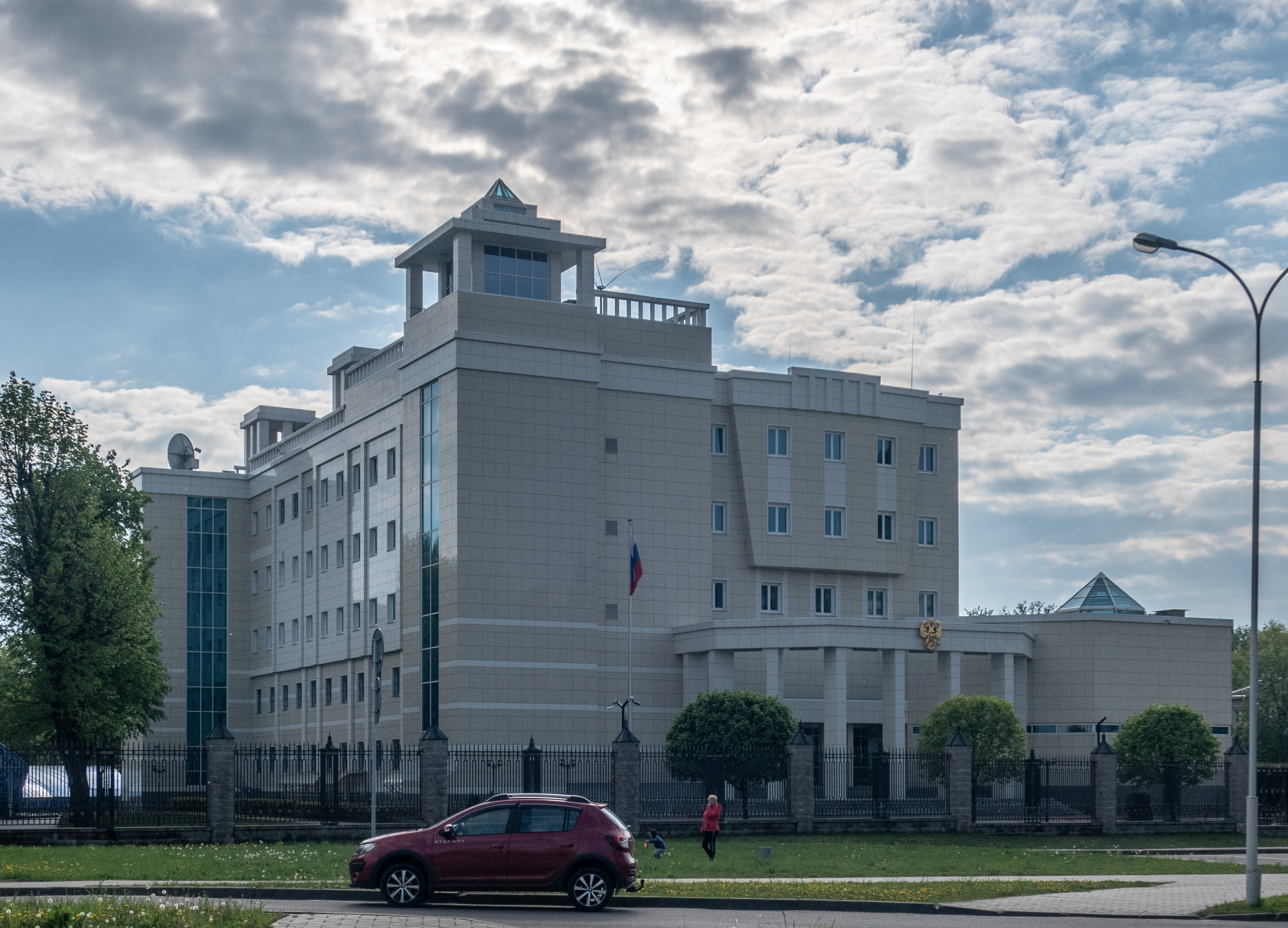
Embassy of Russia in Minsk

== Public opinion ==
According to a May 2025 poll by the Levada Center, 80% of Russians consider Belarus to be among Russia's closest friends and allies.

== Country comparison ==
| | Belarus Republic of Belarus be:Рэспубліка Беларусь ru:Республика Беларусь | Russia Russian Federation Российская Федерация |
|---|---|---|
| Flag & Coat of arms | Belarus | Russia |
| Population | 9,408,400 | 144,386,830 (excluding Crimea and other occupied territories) |
| Area | 207,595 km^{2} (80,153 sq mi) | 17,098,246 km^{2} (6,601,670 sq mi) |
| Population Density | 45.8/km^{2} (118.6/sq mi) | 8.4/km^{2} (21.8/sq mi) |
| Government | Unitary presidential constitutional republic | Federal semi-presidential constitutional republic |
| Capital | Minsk – 2,020,600 | Moscow – 12,506,468 |
| Largest City | Minsk – 2,020,600 | Moscow – 12,506,468 |
| Official language | Belarusian; Russian | Russian |
| Current Head of Government | Prime Minister Alexander Turchin (2025–present) | Prime Minister Mikhail Mishustin (2020–present) |
| Current Head of State | President Alexander Lukashenko (1994–present) | President Vladimir Putin (1999–2008, 2012–present) |
| Main religions | 48.3% Russian Orthodox Church in Belarus; 41.1% Non-religious; 7.1% Roman Catholic; 3.3% Other religions | 71% Russian Orthodox Church; 15% Non-religious; 10% Islam; 4% Other religions |
| Ethnic groups | 83.7% Belarusians; 8.3% Russians; 3.1% Poles; 1.7% Ukrainians; 3.2% Other | 80.9% Russians; 3.9% Tatars; 1.4% Ukrainians; 1.1% Bashkirs; 12.7% Other |
| GDP (nominal) | $63.582 billion $6,744 per capita | $1.702 trillion $11,601 per capita |
| GDP (PPP) | $200.089 billion $21,223 per capita | $4.135 trillion $28,184 per capita |
| Currency | Belarusian rubel (Rbl) – BYN | Russian rouble (₽) – RUB |
| Human Development Index | 0.817 (very high) – 2017 | 0.824 (very high) – 2017 |
| Expatriates | 706,992 Russians in Belarus | 521,443 Belarusians in Russia |

== See also ==
- Druzhba pipeline
- Russification of Belarus
- Belarusians in Russia
- Russians in Belarus
- Belarus–Ukraine relations
