= 2004 Russia–Belarus energy dispute =

Commercial and diplomatic dispute between Russia and Belarus

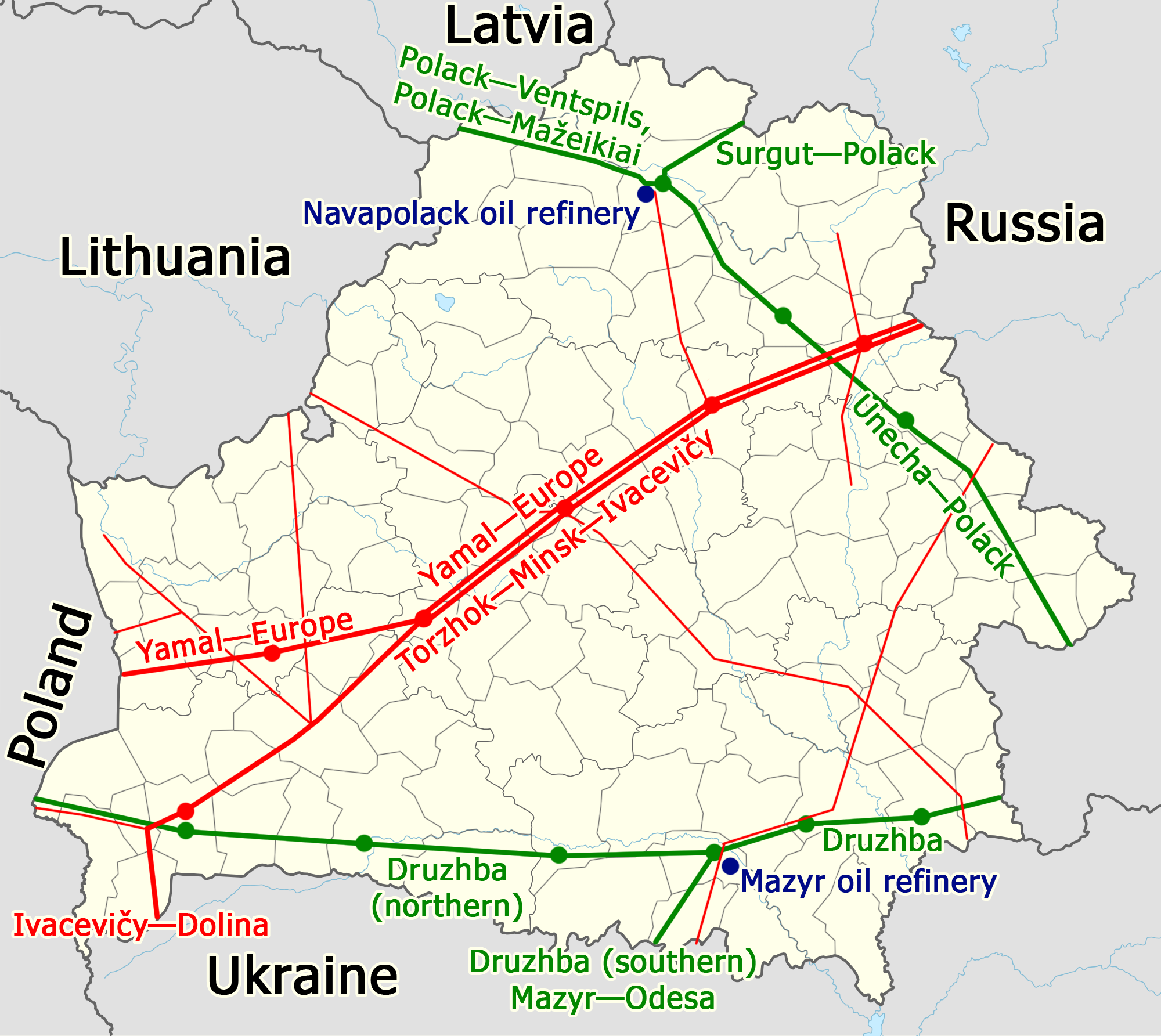
Map showing major gas and oil pipelines in Belarus.

The 2004 Russia–Belarus energy dispute was a commercial and diplomatic dispute between Russia and Belarus that escalated in January 2004. Close relations between the two countries and willingness for political integration had made it possible for Belarus to purchase gas from Russia at heavily discounted prices. In the late 1990s, Russian foreign policy shifted away from geopolitics and became more pragmatic and economical, especially after the inauguration of President Vladimir Putin. As a result, Gazprom moved to ensure the reliability of gas transits to Europe by attempting to establish control over the Belarusian transit network. Belarus initially agreed to sell 50% of the network, but after disagreements over price, Belarus severed the contract. Gazprom announced price rises, and after Belarus refused, Gazprom ceased to import gas to Belarus on 1 January 2004. Belarus compensated by siphoning from gas meant for transit to Europe, which on 18 February resulted in Gazprom completely shutting off the supply to Belarus. Other companies supplied Belarus on short-term contracts until June 2004, when a new contract with Gazprom was finally signed.

== Background ==
=== Economic background ===
Belarus is an important transit route of Russian gas to Europe, with around 20–25% of Gazprom's European exports passing through Belarusian territory. Two major pipelines run through the country: Northern Lights and Yamal-Europe. The former is used to transit Russian gas to Europe as well as for Belarusian domestic use; the latter transits gas solely for export to Europe. The Belarusian economy is heavily gas dependent—gas accounted for 59.9% of the country's energy balance in 2003. In addition, most of the electricity in the country is generated from gas. In 2003, Belarusian gas consumption was 16.66 billion cubic metres (588 billion cubic feet). Domestic gas production amounted to only 0.25 billion cubic metres (8.8 billion cubic feet). The rest was imported from Russia, chiefly from Gazprom. For political reasons, Belarus was able to purchase gas from Russia for Russian domestic prices, which were only a quarter of the international market price. In January, 2003, Belarus paid $34.37 per 1,000 cubic meters for its imports.

=== Political background ===
After the dissolution of the Soviet Union in 1991, Russia and Belarus enjoyed relatively good relations. Both countries strove for political integration, Russia mostly for geopolitical and Belarus chiefly for economic reasons. Russia also saw political integration as a means for eventually gaining full control over the Belarusian transit routes—thus ensuring the reliability of transit. The Belarusian leadership chose to build close relations with Russia, with the ultimate aim of formal unification. Gas price agreements between the two countries were settled politically, with the commercial side being given less attention.

The relations between the two countries began to change as a result of the 1998 Russian financial crisis. Russia no longer saw itself strong enough to sustain its aspirations of superpower status. Consequently, Russia began to attach more significance to geo-economics rather than geo-politics in its relations with CIS neighbours. This development accelerated during Vladimir Putin's presidency, when Russian foreign policy became more pragmatic and economised.

Because of domestic payment collection problems, Belarus accumulated debts for its gas imports. When disagreements over the political integration increased, Gazprom realized that the Belarusian debts would in future undermine the reliability of Belarusian transit routes. Consequently, Gazprom sought to establish a joint venture to own and operate the Belarusian transit network, to ensure uninterrupted transit of gas to Europe.

== 2004 dispute ==
In an intergovernmental agreement signed in April 2002, Belarus promised to sell 50% of Beltransgaz, the company owning the Belarusian transit network, to Gazprom. The agreement also stipulated that gas prices to Belarus would be the same as Russian domestic prices for the next five years. The contract did not specify the value of Beltransgaz. Belarus estimated it as $5–6 billion, while Gazprom proposed a price of $500–600 million. The Belarusian President Alexander Lukashenko later suggested $2.5 billion as a lower limit, but this was rejected by Gazprom. As the political agreements that had given Belarus the right to purchase gas at Russian domestic prices were now broken, Gazprom, backed by the Russian government, now moved to abolish the price discounts.

Gazprom stated that if an agreement was not signed until 2004, it would increase gas prices from $30/m to $50 per 1,000 cubic meters. Belarus refused, and on 1 January 2004, Gazprom stopped shipping gas via the Northern lights pipeline. Belarus was able to compensate by purchasing gas from non-Gazprom exporters such as Itera and TransNafta on short-term contracts. This continued until 18 February, when the companies refused to sign further short-term supply contracts. Since Belarus was dependent on gas for most of its heat and electricity production, the situation in the country during cold winter started to become critical. After deliveries stopped, Belarus started to siphon gas meant for transit to Europe from the Yamal-Europe pipeline, without Gazprom's approval. As a result, at 18:00 Moscow time on 18 February, Gazprom completely cut off supplies to the Belarusian network. Germany experienced only minor shortfalls in deliveries because of extensive storages of gas and due to most of imports coming through Ukraine; however, Poland reported more severe disruption. Supplies to Kaliningrad Oblast were also affected. Belarus managed to sign a new short-term contract with TransNafta at the price of $46.68 per 1,000 cubic meters, which resulted in Gazprom resuming supplies before midnight of 19 February. Similar contracts supplied Belarus until June, when Belarus finally agreed a new contract with Gazprom for delivering gas for the rest of 2004 with the price of $46.68 per 1,000 cubic meters.

In mid-2004, political relations between Belarus and Russia started to improve, and a new agreement between Belarus and Gazprom was signed. The two sides now agreed to appoint an outside consultancy firm to define an appropriate value for the sale of Beltransgaz.

== Implications ==
Although the 2004 dispute further strengthened the perception that Belarus and its economy were heavily dependent on Russian gas and Gazprom, it also became clear that Belarus also possessed some important cards. In 2007, after a later dispute, Gazprom agreed to pay $2.5 billion for Beltransgaz—several times more than it was prepared to pay in 2004. The 2004 dispute also raised concerns about reliability of Gazprom's supplies to Europe, and highlighted the fact that Gazprom had not solved the issue of reliable transit.
