= Trångsund Fortress =

18th-century naval fort in Vysotsk, Russia

Coordinates: 60.635195°N 28.573337°E

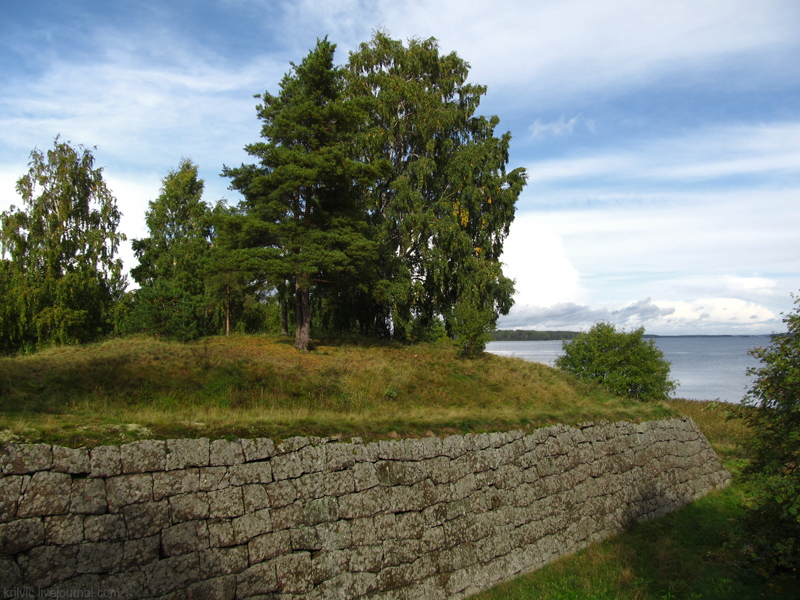
Fortifications in Trångsund

Trångsund Fortress (Russian: крепость Тронгзунд, romanized: krepost Trongzund; Finnish: Uuraan linnoitus) is a naval fort by the Vyborg Bay in the town of Vysotsk, Leningrad Oblast, Russia. It was established by Peter the Great in 1710 to secure the town of Vyborg which was captured from Sweden during the Great Northern War.

The fort is located about 12 kilometres south of Vyborg in the islands of Vysotsky and Maly Vysotsky. Trångsund Fortress received its present form after the Crimean War in the 1860s. The structures dating back to the early 18th Century are no longer visible. In the early 1900s, the fort was intended to be a part of the Peter the Great's Naval Fortress but it was disarmed by the World War I. During the 1918 Finnish Civil War the Trångsund Fortress was occupied by the local Women's Red Guard.
