= Maly Vysotsky Island =

Island in Vyborg Bay, Russia

Coordinates: 60.63944°N 28.56611°E

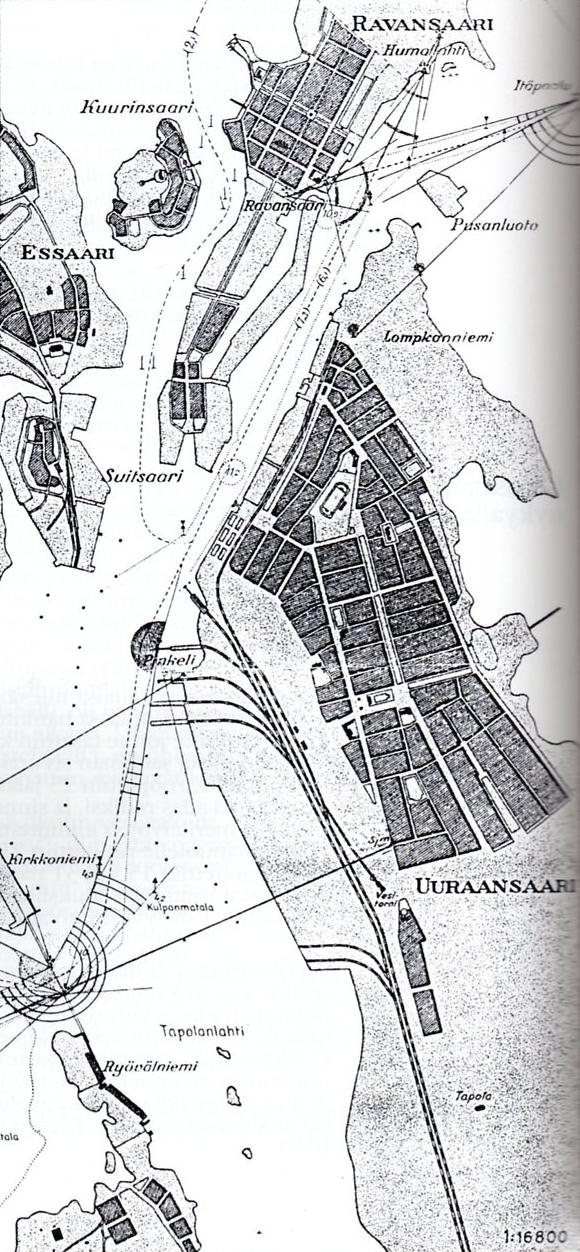
Finnish map of the Vysotsk area (Uuras) with Malyj Vysotskij (Ravansaari) at the top

Maly Vysotsky Island or Malyj Vysotskij Island (Russian: Малый Высоцкий; Finnish: Ravansaari; Swedish: Trångsund) is an island in northwest Russia, that was leased to Finland. It is located in Vyborg Bay, next to Vysotsk, 12 km (7 miles) southwest of Vyborg.

Between 1918 and 1940, the island was a part of Finnish territory, and was called Ravansaari. It was inhabited by nearly one thousand Finns, who earned their livelihood mainly from the timber industry. During World War II, in 1940, it was annexed by the Soviet Union (along with the surrounding territory) and became a part of the Karelo-Finnish SSR. In 1941, it was recaptured by Finnish troops and returned to Finland. In June 1944, the island fell to the Red Army, and once again became part of the Soviet Union, and eventually a small part of the Russian Federation. The island was renamed Malyj Vysotsky. A treaty was signed in 1963 to lease the island and the nearby Saimaa Canal to Finland for fifty years.

Because of the treaty and the island's isolation from both Finland and Russia, radio amateurs made Maly Vysotsky Island an entity of its own, much like Hawaii or Alaska. This and the fact that Alexander Stepanovich Popov did his first radio experiments in the area at the turn of the 20th century made the island an attractive destination for DX-peditioners. All such expeditions were organized by a Finnish-Russian group, the first of which occurred in 1988.

Under the new Saimaa Canal lease treaty signed by the Finnish and Russian governments in 2010, the island is managed once again by Russian authorities. On the 17th of February 2012 the treaty went into effect, and Malyj Vysotsky was deleted from the DXCC list of current amateur radio entities.
