= Embassy of Belarus, Moscow =

Diplomatic mission of Belarus in the Russian Federation

Coordinates: 55°45′30″N 37°38′18″E

Embassy of Belarus in Moscow
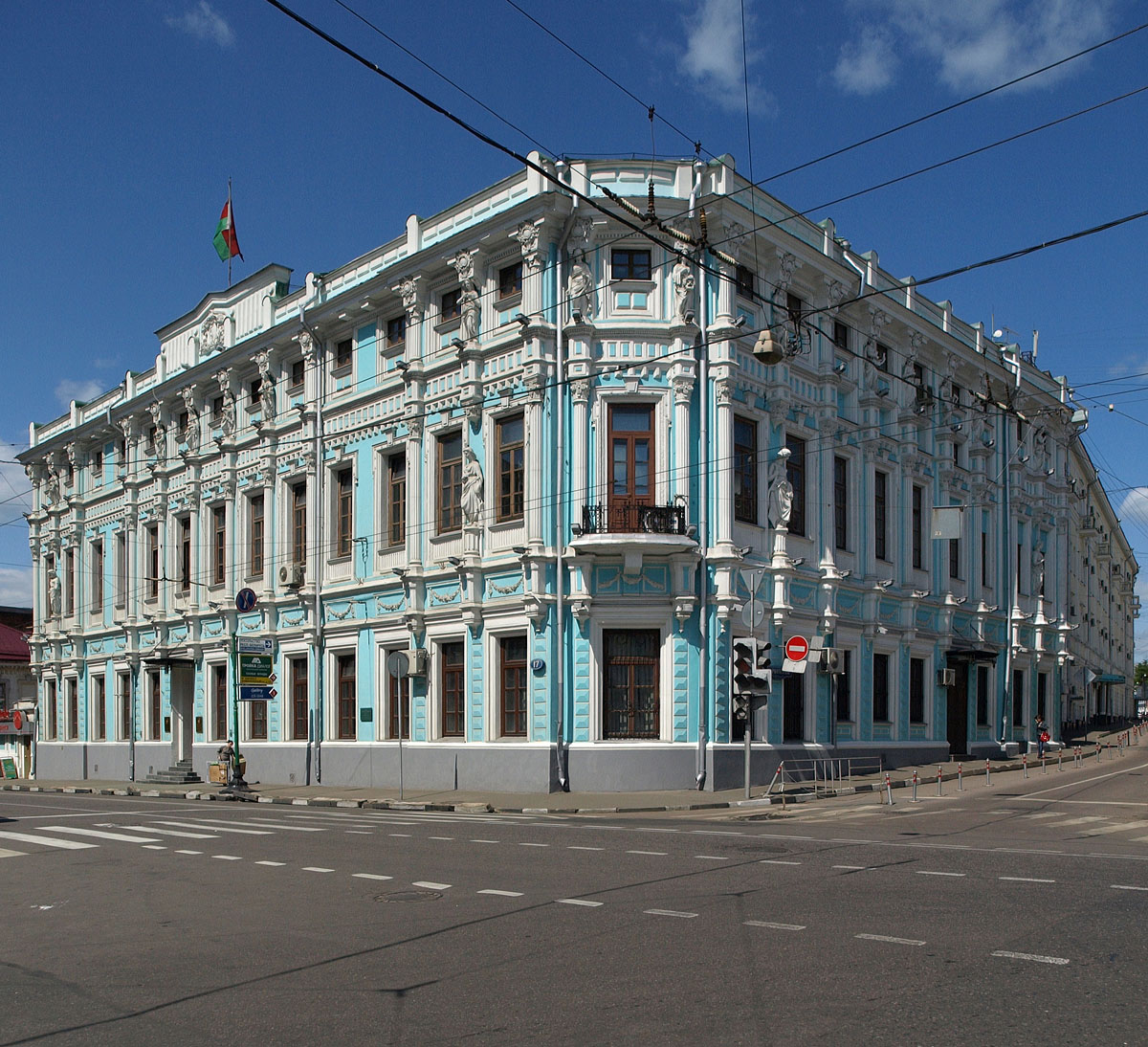
- Location: Moscow
- Ambassador: Dzmitry Kruty

The Embassy of Belarus in Moscow is the chief diplomatic mission of Belarus in the Russian Federation. It is located at 17 Maroseika Street (Russian: ул. Маросейка 17) in the Basmanny District of Moscow.

The embassy is located in the former palace of count Pyotr Rumyantsev, built in 1782. After the October Revolution, the building was nationalized and later transferred to the government of the Belarusian Soviet Socialist Republic and hosted the official representation of the republic to the central government of the Soviet Union. After the dissolution of the Soviet Union, the official representation was transformed into the embassy of the independent Republic of Belarus.

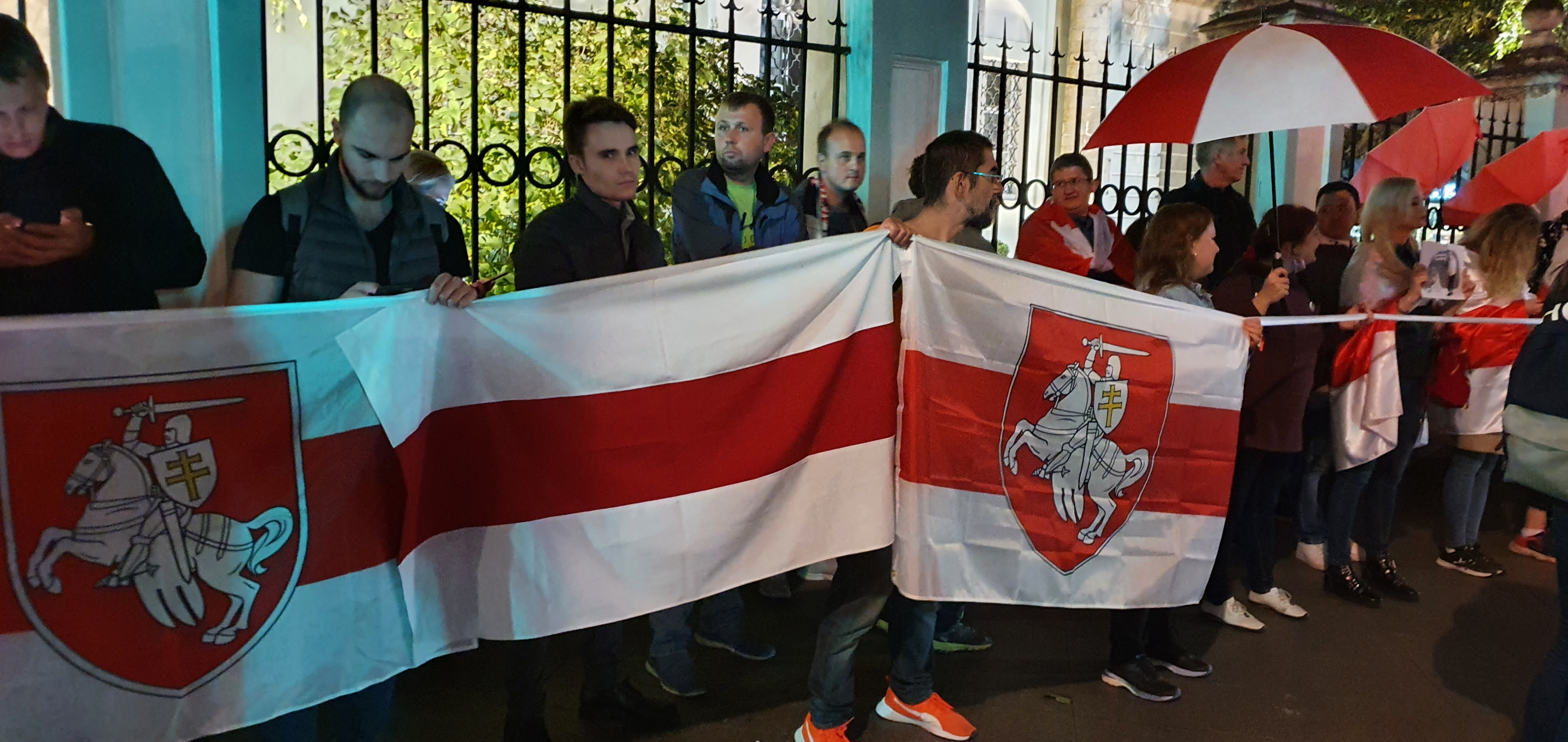
Members of the Belarusian diaspora protesting against the regime of Alexander Lukashenko in front of the embassy of Belarus in Moscow, in September 2020

Since the 1990s, the embassy has become a place for protests against the regime of Alexander Lukashenko by members of the Belarusian diaspora and their Russian supporters. In 2020 and 2021, numerous solidarity demonstrations with the protests in Belarus took place in front of the embassy.

== See also ==
- Belarus–Russia relations
- Diplomatic missions in Russia
