= Pirogovo, Gryazovetsky District, Vologda Oblast =

Pirogovo Пирогово
- Village
- Location within Vologda Oblast Location within Russia
- Coordinates: 58°53′N 40°14′E
- Country: Russia
- Region: Vologda Oblast
- District: Gryazovetsky District
- Time zone: UTC+3:00

Pirogovo (Russian: Пирогово) is a rural locality (a village) in Gryazovetskoye Rural Settlement, Gryazovetsky District, Vologda Oblast, Russia. The population was 206 as of 2002. There are 7 streets.

== Geography ==
Pirogovo is located 2 km north of Gryazovets (the district's administrative centre) by road. Gryazovets is the nearest rural locality.
