= 2007 Russia–Belarus energy dispute =

Economic conflict between Russia and Belarus

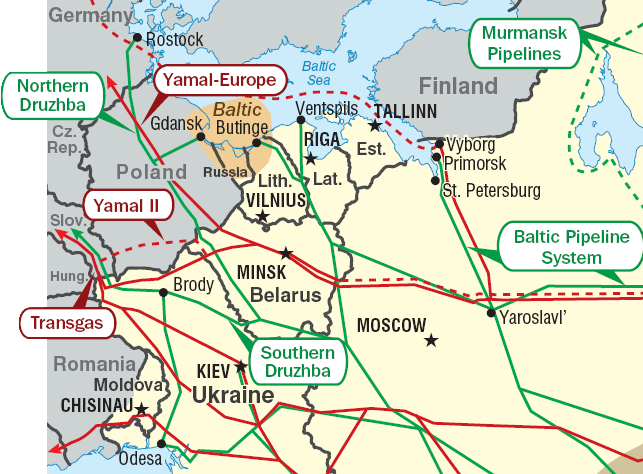
Druzhba pipeline goes from Russia through Belarus to other European countries

The Russia–Belarus energy dispute began when Russian state-owned gas supplier Gazprom demanded an increase in gas prices paid by Belarus, a country which has been closely allied with Moscow and forms a loose union state with Russia. It escalated on 8 January 2007, when the Russian state-owned pipeline company Transneft stopped pumping oil into the Druzhba pipeline which runs through Belarus because Belarus was siphoning the oil off the pipe without mutual agreement. On 10 January, Transneft resumed oil exports through the pipeline after Belarus ended the tariff that sparked the shutdown, despite differing messages from the parties on the state of negotiations.

The Druzhba pipeline, the world's longest, supplies around 20% of Germany's oil. It also supplies oil to Poland, Ukraine, Slovakia, the Czech Republic, and Hungary.

== Background ==
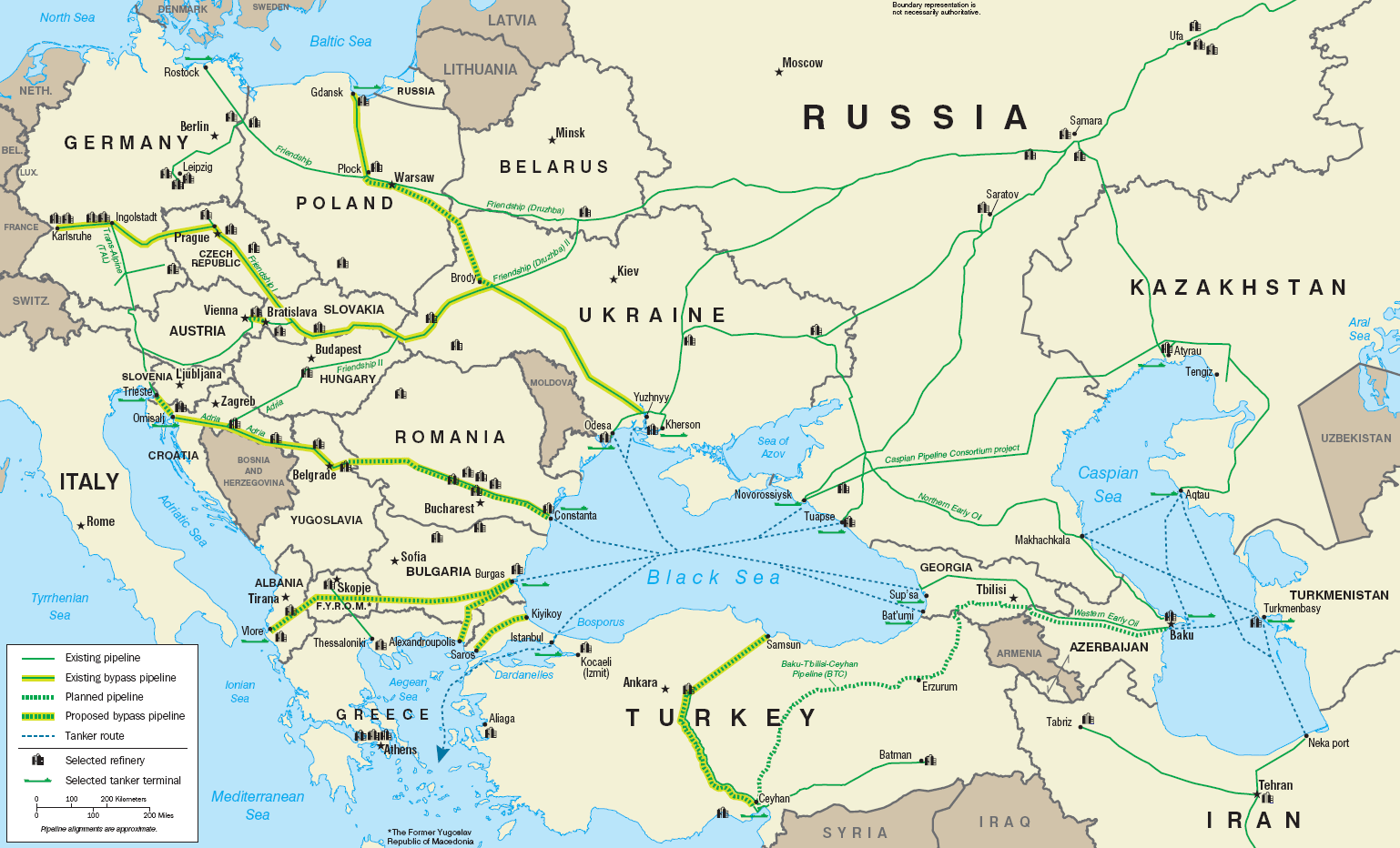
Oil pipelines in Europe and Northwestern Asia.

For a long time, the gas price for most of the former USSR republics was significantly lower than for the Western European countries. In 2006, Belarus paid only $46 per 1000 m^{3}, a fraction compared to $290 per 1000 m^{3} paid by Germany. The annual Russian subsidies to the Belarusian economy were around $4 billion, as Russian president Vladimir Putin said on 9 January 2007. In 2006, Russia announced a higher price for 2007. After Alexander Lukashenko, President of Belarus, rejected this price change, and without a new treaty, Gazprom threatened to cut gas supplies to Belarus from 10:00 MSK on 1 January 2007. Both sides finally agreed on the following terms:

- Russian gas to be sold to Belarus for $100 per 1000 m^{3} (compared to Gazprom's original request of $200 per 1000 m^{3})
- Belarus to sell Gazprom 50% of its national gas supplier Beltransgaz for the maximal price of $2.5 billion
- Gas prices for Belarus to gradually rise to the European market price by 2011
- Belarus's transit fees for Russian gas to increase by around 70%

Another part of the energy dispute is the dispute over oil. In 1995, Russia and Belarus agreed that no customs would be imposed on oil exported to Belarus. In exchange, the revenues from this oil processed in Belarus would be shared by 15% for Belarus and 85% for Russia. In 2001, Belarus unilaterally canceled this agreement while Russia continued its duty-free exports. Lukashenko's state kept all the revenues, and many Russian oil companies moved their processing capacities to Belarus. On this arrangement, Russia also lost billions of dollars annually. Belarus imposed a tariff of US$45 per ton of oil flowing through the Druzhba pipeline, prompting Russia to claim that the move was illegal and to threaten retaliation, since it contradicts bilateral trade agreements and worldwide practice. Only imported or exported goods are being tariffed while transit goods are not objects of tariffing. Russia rejected paying the newly imposed Belarusian tariffs.

In compensation, Belarus began siphoning off oil from the pipeline. According to Semyon Vainshtok, the head of Russia's pipeline monopoly Transneft, Belarus had siphoned off 79,900 metric tons of oil since 6 January. Vainshtok said this was illegal and the move was made "without warning anyone". In response, Russia stopped oil transport on 8 January.

A Belarusian team led by Vice-Premier Andrei Kobyakov flew to Moscow on 9 January to pursue a solution but initially reported that they had not been able to start negotiations.

On 10 January, the Belarusian government lifted the tariff, and Russia agreed to start negotiations. The oil flow was resumed at 05:30 GMT on 11 January. In the wake of the dispute, Gazprom acquired 50% stake in the Belarusian gas pipeline operator Beltransgaz for US$2.5 Billion.

== August 2007 developments ==
Following the alleged violation of previous agreements and the failure of negotiations, on 1 August 2007, Gazprom announced that it would cut gas supplies to Belarus by 45% from 3 August over a $456 million debt. Talks are continuing and Belarus has asked for more time to pay. Although the revived dispute is not expected to hit supplies to Europe, the European Commission is said to view the situation 'very seriously'. Following overnight negotiations in Moscow, on 3 August, $190 million of the debt was repaid, and Belarus was given a further week to pay the remainder or face a 30% cut in supplies.

As of 8 August, Belarus has fully paid its $460 million debt for Russian natural gas supplies, ending a dispute between the country and Gazprom [RTS: GAZP].

== Related disputes ==
The situation is reminiscent of other recent price tensions between Russia, one of the world's energy superpowers, and other states since the start of 2005. These have resulted in increases in the prices paid for gas by Moldova (now paying US$170 per 1,000 cubic meter), Georgia (US$235 per 1,000 cubic meter) and Ukraine (following the 2006 Russia-Ukraine gas dispute, which also resulted in a 4-day cut to European gas supplies).| with Azerbaijan having recently stopped oil exports to Russia.

On 29 July 2006, Russia shut down oil export to Mažeikių oil refinery in Lithuania after an oil spill on the Druzhba pipeline system occurred in Russia's Bryansk oblast, near the point where a line to Belarus and Lithuania branches off the main export pipeline. Transneft said it would need one year and nine months to repair the damaged section. Although Russia cited technical reasons for stopping oil deliveries to Lithuania, Lithuania claims that the oil supply was stopped because Lithuania sold the Mažeikių refinery to Polish company PKN Orlen.

== Impact ==
All IEA member countries who are net oil importers have legal obligation to hold emergency oil reserves, which is equivalent to at least 90 days of net oil imports of the previous year. Furthermore, under the EU regulations there is obligation to hold reserves equivalent to 90 days of consumption, so unlike the gas dispute with Ukraine in 2006, consumers were not affected. Poland had an 80-day oil reserve. The Czech Republic reported drawing oil from its 100-day reserves. Had the dispute prolonged, it is likely that alternative supplies would have been secured. International oil prices were not significantly affected.

The involved countries have, however, expressed concerns about the reliability of the Russia-Belarus oil pipeline and Belarus as an oil middleman supplier.

The events have also provoked renewed discussion on the government policy of phasing out nuclear power in Germany.

== Reaction ==
The European Union has demanded an "urgent and detailed" explanation, according to a spokesman for Energy Commissioner Andris Piebalgs.

Piotr Naimski, Poland's deputy economics minister who is responsible for energy security, stated "This shows once again that arguments among various countries of the former Soviet Union between suppliers and transit countries mean that these deliveries are unreliable from our perspective."

German Economy Minister Michael Glos stated that the dispute showed that "one-side dependencies must not be allowed to develop".

Following a meeting with European Commission President José Manuel Barroso in Berlin, German Chancellor Angela Merkel condemned the action, stating "It is not acceptable when there are no consultations about such actions". Commenting on the importance of trust in energy security, she said "That always destroys trust and no trusting, undisturbed cooperation can be built on that." Merkel continued by saying "We will certainly say to our Russian partners but also to Belarus that such consultations are the minimum when there are problems, and I think that that must become normality, as it would be within the European Union." Barroso said that "while there is no immediate risk to supplies, it is not acceptable" for such actions to be undertaken without prior consultation.

== See also ==
- Belarus–Russia relations
- 2004 Russia–Belarus gas dispute
- Russia–Ukraine gas dispute
- Energy crisis
- Nord Stream 1, an undersea pipeline constructed to bypass transit countries
- Energy Charter Treaty, including principles for energy trade and transit which Russia is refusing to ratify.
- Energy policy of Russia
- Energy policy of the European Union
- Milk War
