= Svistunovo, Vologda Oblast =

Svistunovo Свистуново
- Village
- Location within Vologda Oblast Location within Russia
- Coordinates: 58°50′N 40°14′E
- Country: Russia
- Region: Vologda Oblast
- District: Gryazovetsky District
- Time zone: UTC+3:00

Svistunovo (Russian: Свистуново) is a rural locality (a village) in Gryazovetskoye Rural Settlement, Gryazovetsky District, Vologda Oblast, Russia. The population was 34 as of 2002.

== Geography ==
Svistunovo is located 3 km south of Gryazovets (the district's administrative centre) by road. Krestovka is the nearest rural locality.
