= Yamal–Europe pipeline =

Natural gas pipeline from Russia to Germany

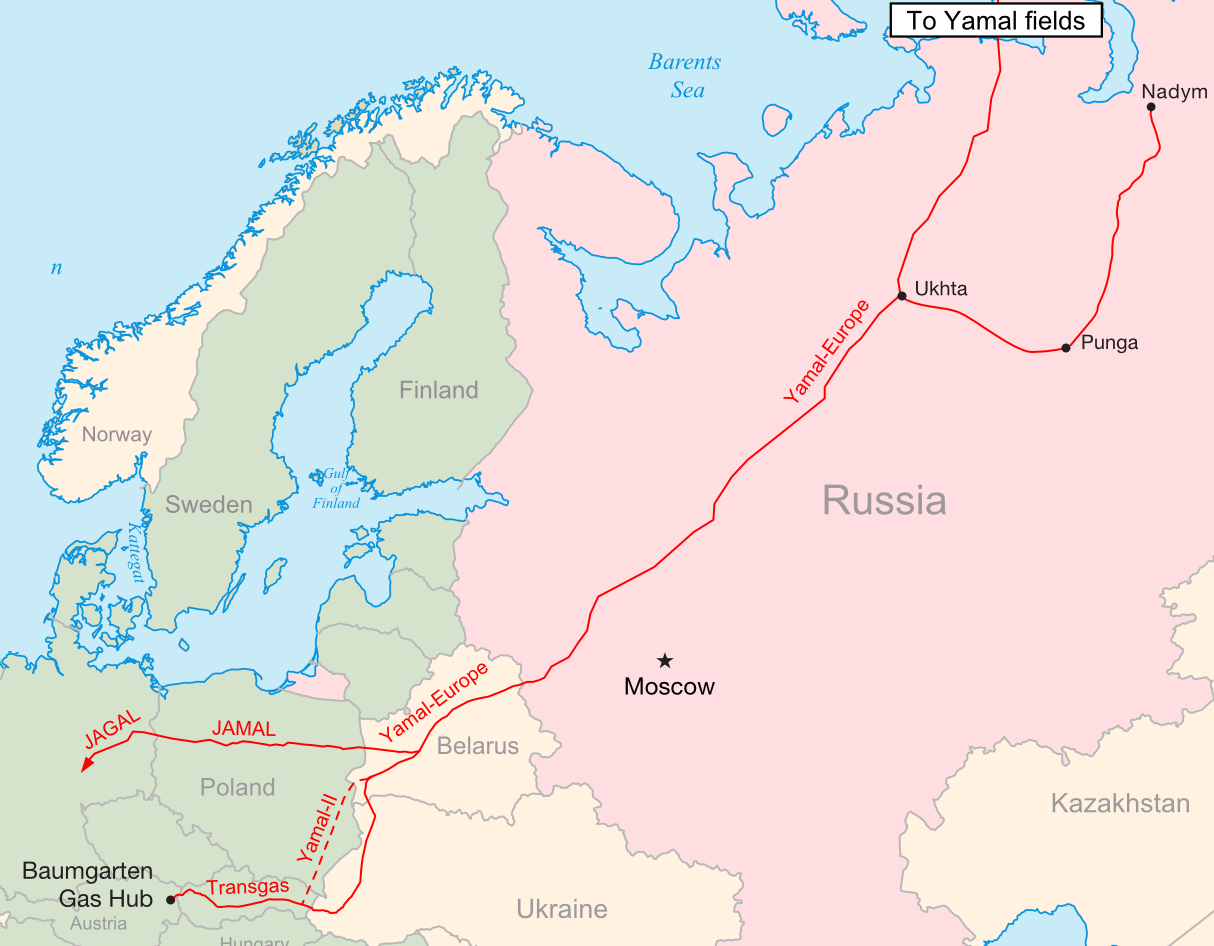
- Location of Yamal–Europe pipeline

Location
- Country: Russia, Belarus, Poland
- Direction: north-southwest
- Start: Bovanenkovo gas field and Novy Urengoy
- Passes through: Vuktyl, Ukhta, Gryazovets, Torzhok, Smolensk, Minsk, Zambrów, Włocławek, Poznań
- To: Górzyca
- Runs alongside: Northern Lights pipeline (partly)

General information
- Type: natural gas
- Partners: Gazprom; PGNiG; Gas-Trading S.A.
- Operator: Gazprom; Gazprom Transgaz Belaru; EuRoPol Gaz
- Construction started: 1994
- Commissioned: 2006 (fully)

Technical information
- Length: 4,107 km (2,552 mi)
- Maximum discharge: 33 billion m^{3}/a (1.2 trillion cu ft/a)

The Yamal–Europe natural gas pipeline is a 4,107-kilometre-long (2,552 mi) pipeline connecting Russian natural gas fields in the Yamal Peninsula and Western Siberia with Poland and Germany, through Belarus. The Poland portion ceased operating in 2022.

In Gazprom's development project nomenclature the pipeline consists of four sections, Bovanenkovo–Ukhta (1,200 km or 750 mi), Ukhta–Torzhok (970 km or 600 mi), the western section from Torzhok also confusingly named Yamal–Europe (1,660 km or 1,030 mi), and the partly parallel SRTO–Torzhok branch section (2,200 km or 1,400 mi).

== History ==
Planning for the Yamal–Europe pipeline started in 1992. Intergovernmental treaties between Russia, Belarus and Poland were signed in 1993. In 1994, Wingas started building the Poland section of the pipeline. The first gas was delivered to Germany through the Belarus-Polish corridor in 1997. The Belarus and Polish sections were completed in September 1999.

Construction of the Bovanenkovo–Ukhta section started in December 2008, at about the same time drilling of the first production well in the Bovanenkovo gas field started. The pipeline reached its rated capacity of about 33 billion cubic metres per annum (1.2 trillion cubic feet per annum) of natural gas in 2006, after completion of all compressor stations. The total cost of building the pipeline has been estimated at $36 billion.

=== Polish gas price reviews ===
In 2012, a 10% reduction in the gas price for the Polish state-controlled oil and gas company PGNiG was agreed.

In 2020, the Stockholm Arbitration Tribunal ruled that PGNiG’s long-term contract gas price with Gazprom, linked to an index of oil and gas prices, should be changed to approximate the Western European gas market price, backdated to 1 November 2014 when PGNiG requested a price review under the contract. Gazprom had to refund about $1.5 billion to PGNiG. The 1996 contract is for up to 10.2 billion cubic metres per annum (360 billion cubic feet per annum) of gas until it expires in 2022, with a minimum amount of 8.7 billion cubic metres per annum (310 billion cubic feet per annum).

During the 2021 global energy crisis, PGNiG made a further price review request on 28 October 2021. PGNiG stated the recent extraordinary increases in natural gas prices "provides a basis for renegotiating the price terms on which we purchase gas under the Yamal Contract."

=== Polish pipeline section ===
In 2019, as part of Poland's plans to become energy independent from Russia, Piotr Wozniak, president of PGNiG, stated "The strategy of the company is just to forget about Eastern suppliers and especially about Gazprom." PGNiG intends to diversify supplies primarily through a switch to liquefied natural gas (LNG) supplies imported from Qatar, the U.S. and Norway, and possibly a pipeline to Norway, greatly reducing the significance of supply through the Yamal pipeline.

Transit on the Polish section of the pipeline onto western Europe was until 18 May 2020 enabled by a long-term transit agreement with Gazprom. From 2020 to 2021, in accord with the EU Capacity Allocation Mechanisms NC regulation 2017/459, transit was offered to all parties on a yearly, quarterly, monthly, daily and intraday basis. In July 2021 Gazprom decided not to book an annual contract, creating concern that Gazprom no longer planned to use the pipeline all year as a route to transport gas to Europe.

The pipeline was closed by the Polish government in 2022 following a payment dispute with Russia after the Russian invasion of Ukraine and broad international sanctions. Shares in the pipeline were frozen and could not be traded by Russia. In 2023 Poland took over the 48% Gazprom shares.

=== Disruptions ===
There have been at least seven interruptions, either complete suspensions or restrictions, in gas supply to Poland in the 18 years prior to April 2022. Depending on the type of incident, these interruptions that lasted from a few days to half a year.

On 6 November 2021, Reuters reported that gas delivery through the Polish section had been halted, or the flow has been reversed. According PGNiG, everything is fine from their point of view, as Poland received gas from both the east and the west, according to domestic demand and gas pricing. Russia has been accused of intentionally reducing gas flows to Europe for political purposes, but generally high Russian domestic requirements led to this situation. On 9 November 2021, westward flows into Germany were re-established, and the Kremlin pledged again to increase the delivery of natural gas to Europe.

On 26 April 2022, PGNiG's press office informed that "Gazprom has formally applied to PGNiG with a letter on legal changes in the Russian Federation regarding the change in the rules of payment for gas supplies".

The Baltic Pipe between Norway and Poland will have the capacity to replace the roughly 60% of Polish gas imports coming from Russia via the Yamal pipeline, and became operational in October 2022. At the end of 2019, the management of PGNiG decided not to extend the Yamal contract that was due to expire at the end of 2022.

On 26 April 2022, Gazprom announced it would stop delivering natural gas to Poland via the Yamal–Europe pipeline, as well as to Bulgaria, as both countries had rejected Russia's demand that payments for gas be made in Russian rubles - a demand allegedly constituting breach of contract. Poland said it did not expect disruptions in supply due to its natural gas storage facilities being about 75% full (ensuring 40–180 days of supply), the Poland–Lithuania gas pipeline becoming operational in May that year, the Baltic Pipe natural gas pipeline between Poland and Norway becoming operational in October. Poland can also import gas via the Świnoujście LNG terminal. As of 29 September 2022, eastward flow of gas from Germany to Poland through the Yamal–Europe pipeline is stable.

== Route ==
The section west of the Torzhok gas hub includes about 402 kilometres (250 mi) in Russia, 575 kilometres (357 mi) in Belarus and 683 kilometres (424 mi) in Poland. It is fed from the north-east by the Bovanenkovo–Ukhta, Ukhta–Torzhok and SRTO–Torzhok sections, which are all considered to be part of the Yamal–Europe pipeline. The German gas system is connected to the Yamal–Europe pipeline through the JAGAL pipeline. The Bovanenkovo–Ukhta section involved a 72 kilometres (45 mi) undersea pipeline under Baydaratskaya Bay in the southern Kara Sea.

The western section of the pipeline was initially supplied by the slowly depleting gas fields in the Nadym Pur Taz District of the Tyumen Oblast and not from the Yamal project. The SRTO–Torzhok branch section starts at Novy Urengoy, near the developing Urengoyskoye gas field within the Urengoy gas field complex. As of 2020, the Yamal gas fields produced over 20% of Russia's gas, which was expected, as of 2021, to increase to 40% by 2030.

== Technical features ==
The capacity of the pipeline is 33 billion cubic metres (1.2 trillion cubic feet) of natural gas per annum. The diameter of the pipeline is 1,420 millimetres (56 in). The pressure in the pipeline is provided by 14 compressor stations.

== Ownership ==
The Russian section of the pipeline is owned and operated by Gazprom. The Belarusian section is owned by Gazprom and operated by Gazprom Transgaz Belarus. The Polish section is owned and operated by EuRoPol Gaz S.A., a joint venture of the Polish PGNiG, Russian Gazprom, initially with a 4% holding by Polish Gas-Trading S.A. It was agreed in 2009 that this small holding would be sold, leaving both partners with 50%.

In 2022 the Gazprom shares in EuRoPol Gaz S.A were put under management after sanctions froze the shares and in October 2023 the shares were transferred to Polish oil concern Orlen, which became the 100% owner of the Polish portion of the pipe. Poland sets compensation for the 684-km Polish section of the Yamal pipeline at 787 million zloty ($183m).

== Second pipeline ==
In 2005, there were plans to build a second leg of the pipeline via Belarus. On 1 November 2007, the Russian minister of industry and energy Viktor Khristenko said these plans had been dropped, because construction of the Nord Stream 1 pipeline was preferred.

== See also ==
- Druzhba pipeline – Oil pipeline from Tatarstan, Russia - oil pipeline that also flows through Belarus and Poland
- List of natural gas pipelines
- Russia in the European energy sector
- Urengoy–Pomary–Uzhhorod pipeline – Russia-Ukraine gas transporter - 1980s gas pipeline to the south of Yamal–Europe pipeline
