= Vysotsk =

Vysotsk Высоцк
- Town
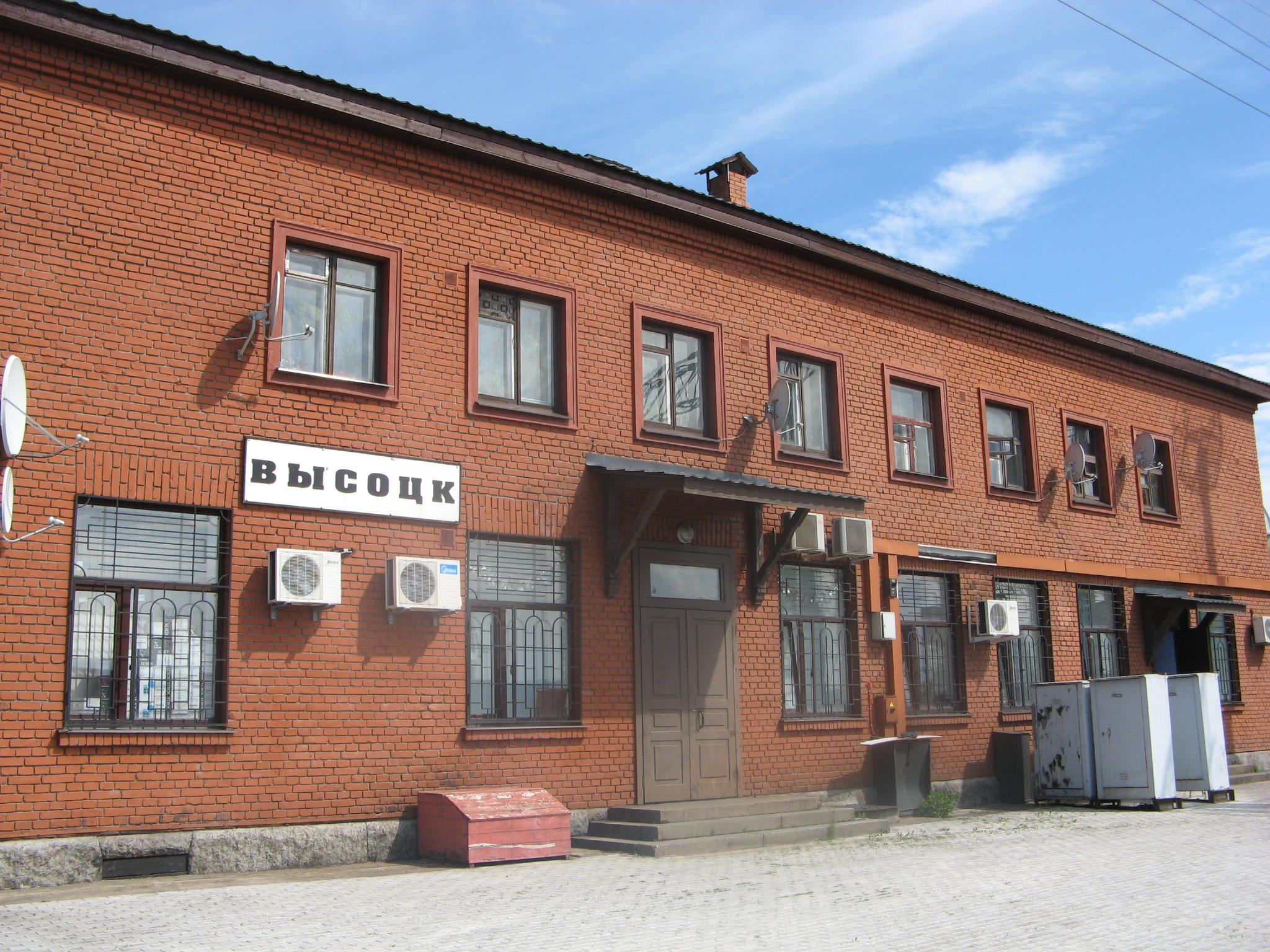
- Vysotsk railway station

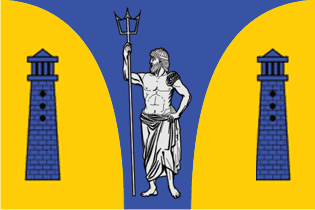
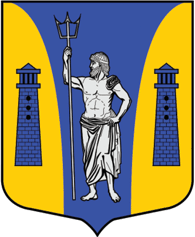
- Flag Coat of arms
- Interactive map of Vysotsk
- Location of Vysotsk Vysotsk (Leningrad Oblast)
- Coordinates: 60°37′N 28°35′E
- Country: Russia
- Federal subject: Leningrad Oblast
- Administrative district: Vyborgsky District
- Settlement municipal formationSelsoviet: Vysotskoye Settlement Municipal Formation
- Founded: beginning of the 18th century
- Town status since: 1940

Population (2010 Census)
  - Total: 1,244
  - Estimate (2024): 1,121 (−9.9%)

Administrative status
  - Capital of: Vysotskoye Settlement Municipal Formation

Municipal status
  - Municipal district: Vyborgsky Municipal District
  - Urban settlement: Vysotskoye Urban Settlement
  - Capital of: Vysotskoye Urban Settlement
- Time zone: UTC+3 (MSK)
- Postal code: 188909
- OKTMO ID: 41615104001

Vysotsk (Russian: Высо́цк; Finnish: Uuras; Swedish: Trångsund) is a coastal town and a seaport in Vyborgsky District of Leningrad Oblast, Russia, located on the Karelian Isthmus, on the eastern shore of the Vyborg Bay, 12 kilometers (7.5 mi) southwest of Vyborg and 159 kilometers (99 mi) northwest of St. Petersburg. It hosts a base of the Russian Baltic Fleet and, since 2004, an oil terminal. Population: 1,244 (2010 census); 1,673 (2002 census); 929 (1989 Soviet census). In terms of population, it remains one of the smallest towns in Russia.

== History ==
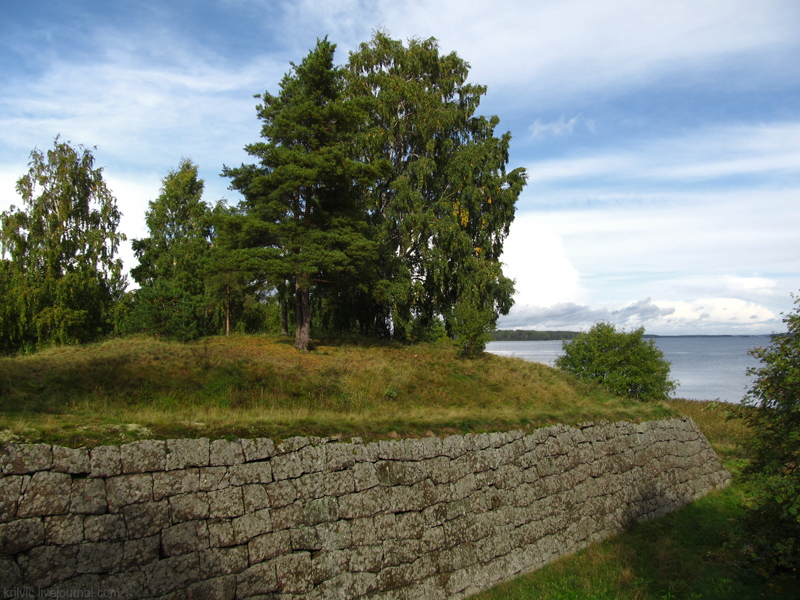
Trångsund Fortress

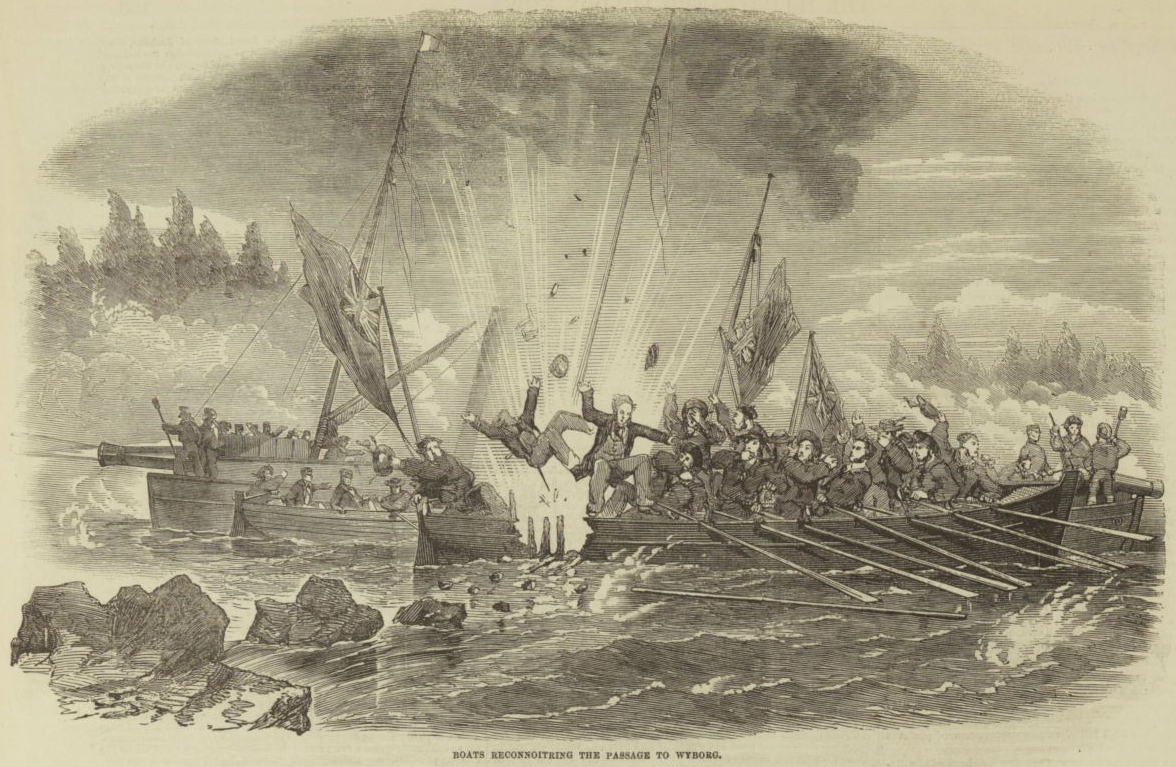
Boats reconnoitring the Passage to Wyborg, 1855 Crimean War sketch

The Trångsund Fortress (lit. 'narrow strait') was built by the order of Peter the Great in the beginning of the 18th century after the Tsardom of Russia had captured the area from Sweden during the Great Northern War.

In 1812, Trongzund was included by Alexander I into the newly created Grand Duchy of Finland. It was published in The Illustrated London News on 11 August 1855 at the height of the Crimean War: "The transaction took place a few weeks ago. The boats of the Arrogant and the Magicienne, with a gun boat in company, manned and armed, were sent to reconnoitre in the passage leading into Wyborg. When within 200 yards of the shore an ambuscade of Russian sharpshooters opened fire upon them which was sharply returned by our men. Finding that they were too much exposed to the Russian musketry, the boats retreated under cover of the gun-boat:. In this encounter we regret to add that four or five men were severely wounded, and, in consequence of the explosion of one of the boat's magazines, a midshipman was thrown overboard and drowned. The mast and rigging of the boats were also very much cut up by the fire of the riflemen. Owing to the shallowness of the water, the Arrogant and Magicienne were unable to render any assistance. As regards the recent proceedings of the Baltic fleet, a letter from Nargen of the 31st ult., saysː- The Amphion has been for some time reconnoitring all the channels near Sveaborg and has found many valuable anchorages, and several points where the coasting trade between Borgo and Helsingfors, which was carried out to a considerable extent. that be entirely stopped, and some surprise is expressed that so little was attempted it this way last year by the vessels stationed in that vicinity The Admiral, to assist Captain Kay in carrying out this service, had planned the Dragon, and a French and English gun-boat under his orders, with which vessels, he proceeded very nearly to Borgo, which appears to be without any defences, and they met with no resistance whatever, except from shoals, the gun-boats having grounded several times. It is added that- All the gun and mortar boats are going over to Helsingfors. The town will probably be shelled; but it is not expected that the fortifications can be destroyed."

Between 1918 and 1940, the town was part of Viipuri Province of independent Finland under the name Uuras. As a result of the Winter War and subsequent Moscow Peace Treaty, it was occupied by the Soviet Union in 1940 and became a part of Vyborgsky District of the Karelo-Finnish SSR. In 1941, during the Continuation War, it was liberated by Finnish troops and returned to Finland. In June 1944, the town was occupied by the Red Army and was annexed to the Soviet Union according to the Moscow Armistice and Paris Peace Treaty. On November 24, 1944, it was transferred to Leningrad Oblast. In July 1948, the town was renamed Vysotsk in honor of the Soviet machine gunner Kuzma Demidovich Vysotsky, who was killed in the area on March 4, 1940 during the final days of the Winter War.

Vysotsk may be considered one of the cradles of radio, as it was there that Alexander Popov conducted his pioneering experiments in 1897 and 1902.

== Administrative and municipal status ==
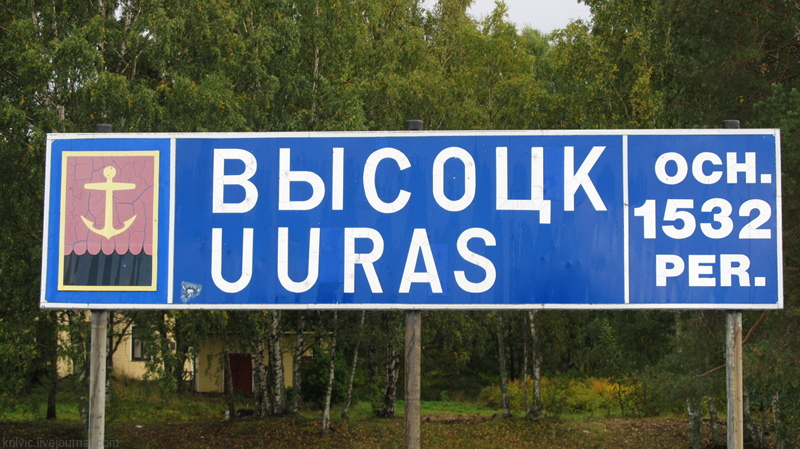
Highway sign at entry to Vysotsk

Within the framework of administrative divisions, it is incorporated within Vyborgsky District as Vysotskoye Settlement Municipal Formation. As a municipal division, Vysotskoye Settlement Municipal Formation is incorporated within Vyborgsky Municipal District as Vysotskoye Urban Settlement.

== Economy ==
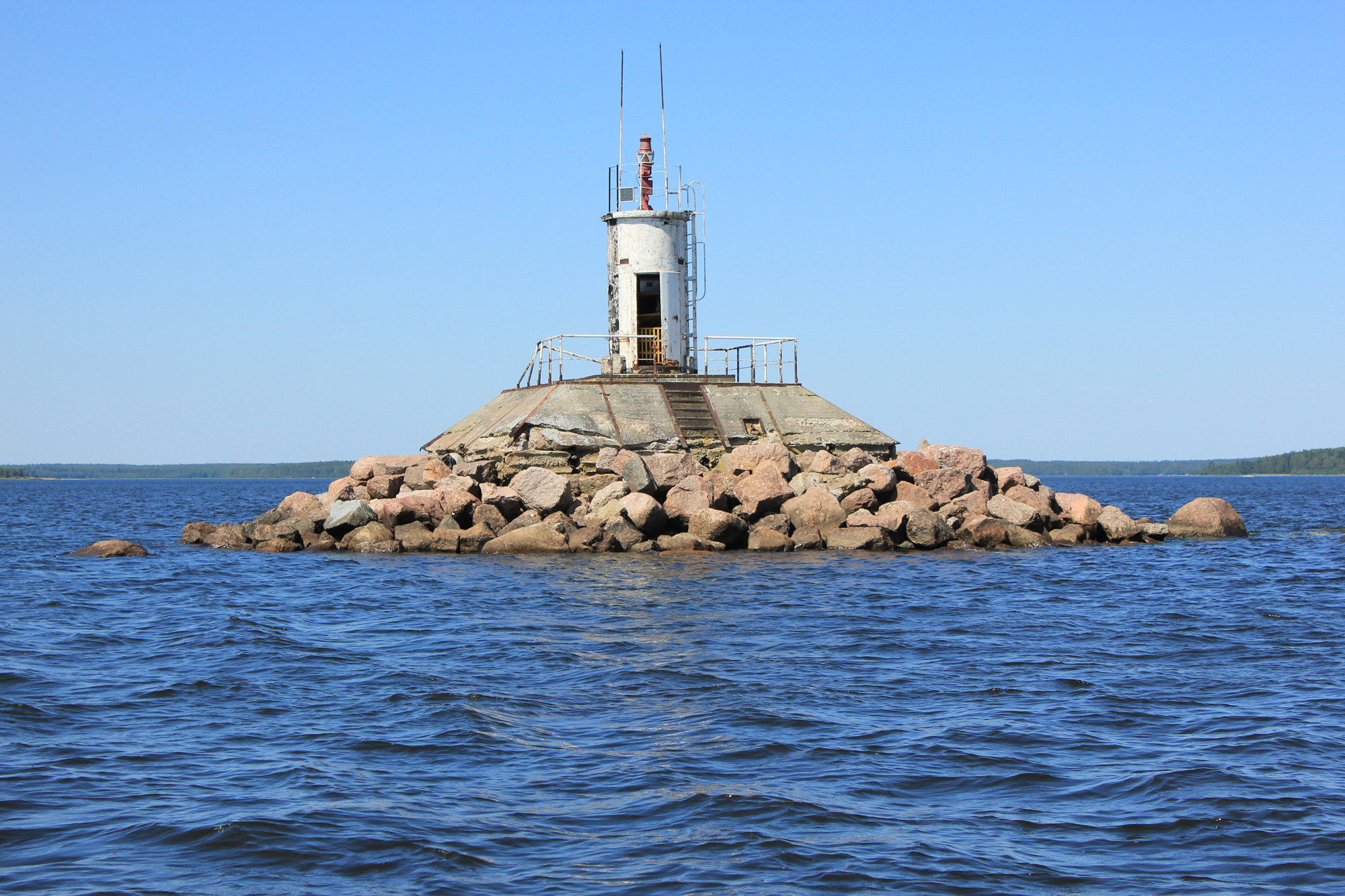
A lighthouse near Vysotsk, seen from the water

Vysotsk, along with Vyborg and Primorsk, is one of the three most important Russian ports in the Gulf of Finland. All three towns are connected by roads.

There is a railway station in Vysotsk, the end station of a railway line branching off at Popovo railway station; however, there is no passenger service.

The region serves many functions, amongst which Gazprom-operated Portovaya LNG and Vysotsk LNG.
