= Gryazovets–Vyborg gas pipeline =

Branch pipeline of the Northern Lights pipeline

Location
- Country: Russia
- Direction: east-west
- Start: Gryazovets
- Passes through: Vologda Oblast, Leningrad Oblast
- To: Vyborg

General information
- Type: natural gas
- Operator: Gazprom

Technical information
- Length: 917 km (570 mi)

Gryazovets–Vyborg gas pipeline (GVGP, Russian: Грязовец–Выборг) is a branch pipeline of the Northern Lights pipeline from Gryazovets in central part of Russian Federation through Vologda and Leningrad oblasts to Saint Petersburg, Vyborg, and Finland. The third line of this pipeline was built to feed the Nord Stream 1 pipeline.

== Status ==
The GVGP is a part of the Russian unified gas transportation system. The third line connects the grid in Gryazovets with the Vysotsk LNG coastal compressor station. It runs in parallel with other two lines of the Northern Lights pipeline. The pipeline is designed, constructed, and operated solely by Gazprom. It feeds the Nord Stream gas pipeline as also supplies gas to the Northwestern region of Russia (Saint Petersburg and Leningrad Oblast), as well as a liquefied natural gas terminal in Portovaya that started in September 2022 for shipping to Kaliningrad.

== Technical features ==
The length of the third line is 917 kilometres (570 mi). It has diameter of 1,420 millimetres (56 in) and working pressure of 9.8 MPa (97 atm), which is secured by seven compressor stations. The Portovaya compressor station on the Russian coast of the Baltic Sea in the Portovaya Bay near Vyborg has been called "unique" because of its planned capacity and working pressure.

== Construction ==
Construction of the third line of the Gryazovets–Vyborg gas pipeline began on 9 December 2005 in the town of Babayevo (Vologda Oblast), and it was completed in 2010.

== See also ==
- South Stream
