= Gryazovets =

Town in Vologda Oblast, Russia

Gryazovets Грязовец
- Town
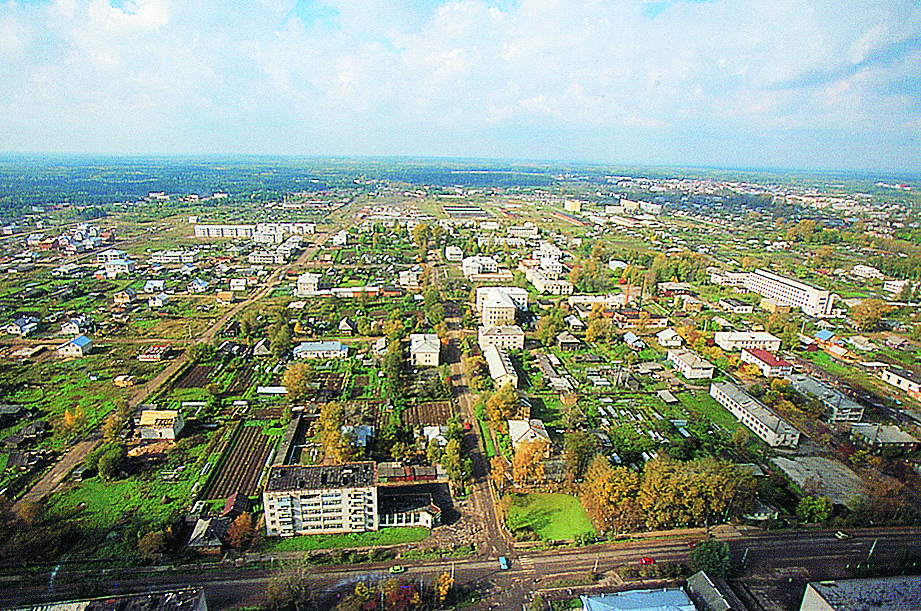
- Aerial photo, Gryazovets

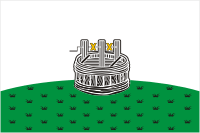
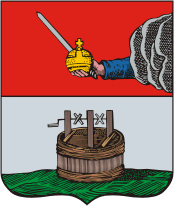
- Flag Coat of arms
- Interactive map of Gryazovets
- Location of Gryazovets Gryazovets (Vologda Oblast)
- Coordinates: 58°53′N 40°15′E
- Country: Russia
- Federal subject: Vologda Oblast
- Administrative district: Gryazovetsky District
- Town of district significanceSelsoviet: Gryazovets
- First mentioned: 1538
- Town status since: January 25, 1780
- Elevation: 185 m (607 ft)

Population (2010 Census)
  - Total: 15,528
  - Estimate (2023): 14,424 (−7.1%)

Administrative status
  - Capital of: Gryazovetsky District, town of district significance of Gryazovets

Municipal status
  - Municipal district: Gryazovetsky Municipal District
  - Urban settlement: Gryazovetskoye Urban Settlement
  - Capital of: Gryazovetsky Municipal District, Gryazovetskoye Urban Settlement
- Time zone: UTC+3 (MSK)
- Postal code: 162000
- OKTMO ID: 19624101001

Gryazovets (Russian: Гря́зовец) is a town and the administrative center of Gryazovetsky District in Vologda Oblast, Russia, located on the Rzhavka River, 47 kilometers (29 mi) south of Vologda, the administrative center of the oblast. Population: 15,528 (2010 census); 16,172 (2002 census); 16,424 (1989 Soviet census).

== History ==
The first mention of Gryazovets dates back to 1538, when it was described as a settlement dependent on the Korniliyevo-Komelsky Monastery. The settlement was chartered on January 25, 1780, when it became the seat of Gryazovetsky Uyezd of Vologda Viceroyalty. The viceroyalty was abolished in 1796 and its part which included Gryazovetsky Uyezd became Vologda Governorate.

Throughout the 19th century, the population of Gryazovets varied between two and three thousand, most of whom were employed in agriculture. The most common industry was dyeing. In 1872, the railway connecting Yaroslavl and Vologda was built, and a railway station was open in Gryazovets, facilitating the development of the trade.

On August 7, 1924, Gryazovetsky Uyezd was abolished and the territory was included into Vologodsky Uyezd. On July 15, 1929, several governorates, including Vologda Governorate, were merged into Northern Krai, the uyezds were abolished, and Gryazovets became the administrative center of the newly established Gryazovetsky District.

== Administrative and municipal status ==
Within the framework of administrative divisions, Gryazovets serves as the administrative center of Gryazovetsky District. As an administrative division, it is incorporated within Gryazovetsky District as the town of district significance of Gryazovets.

As a municipal division, the town of district significance of Gryazovets, together with the village of Pirogovo in Pertsevsky Selsoviet and the village of Svistunovo in Rostilovsky Selsoviet of Gryazovetsky District, is incorporated within Gryazovetsky Municipal District as Gryazovetskoye Urban Settlement.

== Economy ==
=== Industry ===
Gryazovets hosts timber industry and food industry enterprises.

=== Transportation ===
One of the principal highways in Russia, M8, which connects Moscow and Arkhangelsk, passes near Gryazovets. There are also local roads, with the bus traffic originating from Gryazovets.

In Gryazovets, there is a railway station on the railroad connecting Yaroslavl and Vologda.

Gryazovets has a gas-pumping station. Here, the Gryazovets–Vyborg gas pipeline branches off the main Northern Lights pipeline in the western direction.

== Culture and recreation ==
Gryazovets contains fifty objects classified as cultural and historical heritage of local importance. Additionally, the building of a high school is protected as a historical monument of federal significance. The center of the town of Gryazovets mainly preserved the historical buildings from the 19th century. Close to Gryazovets there are ruins of the Korniliyevo-Komelsky Monastery which was abolished in 1924.

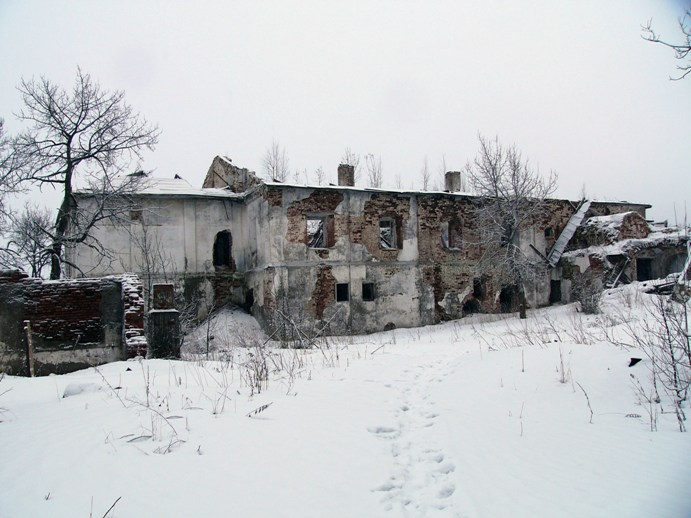
Ruins of the Korniliyevo-Komelsky Monastery

The only museum in Gryazovets is the Gryazovets District Museum.
