= Vysotsk LNG =

Russian power station

Coordinates: 60.6056°N 28.5497°E

Vysotsk LNG, or Cryogas-Vysotsk, plant is a small operation with access to the Baltic Sea, owned by Novatek and Gazprombank. It started operation in 2019 and the two trains have a capacity of 0.67 MTPA. Plans are in place in 2023 to expand the operation to 0.9 MTPA. It is on a peninsula south of Vysotsk village, which also houses port operations and the "Lukoil-2" petroleum tank farm.

NASA's FIRMS detected the fire at the Vysotsk LNG terminal from 2024-05-17 23:16:00 (UTC) to 2024-05-20 00:20:00 (UTC)

On 19 May 2024 a social media OSINT account reported an extensive fire of unknown origin at the Vysotsk LNG terminal confirmed by NASA's FIRMS.

== See also ==
- Port of Vysotsk
- Port of Primorsk
