= Vuktyl =

Town in the Komi Republic, Russia

Vuktyl Вуктыл
- Town

Other transcription(s)
  - Komi: Вуктыл
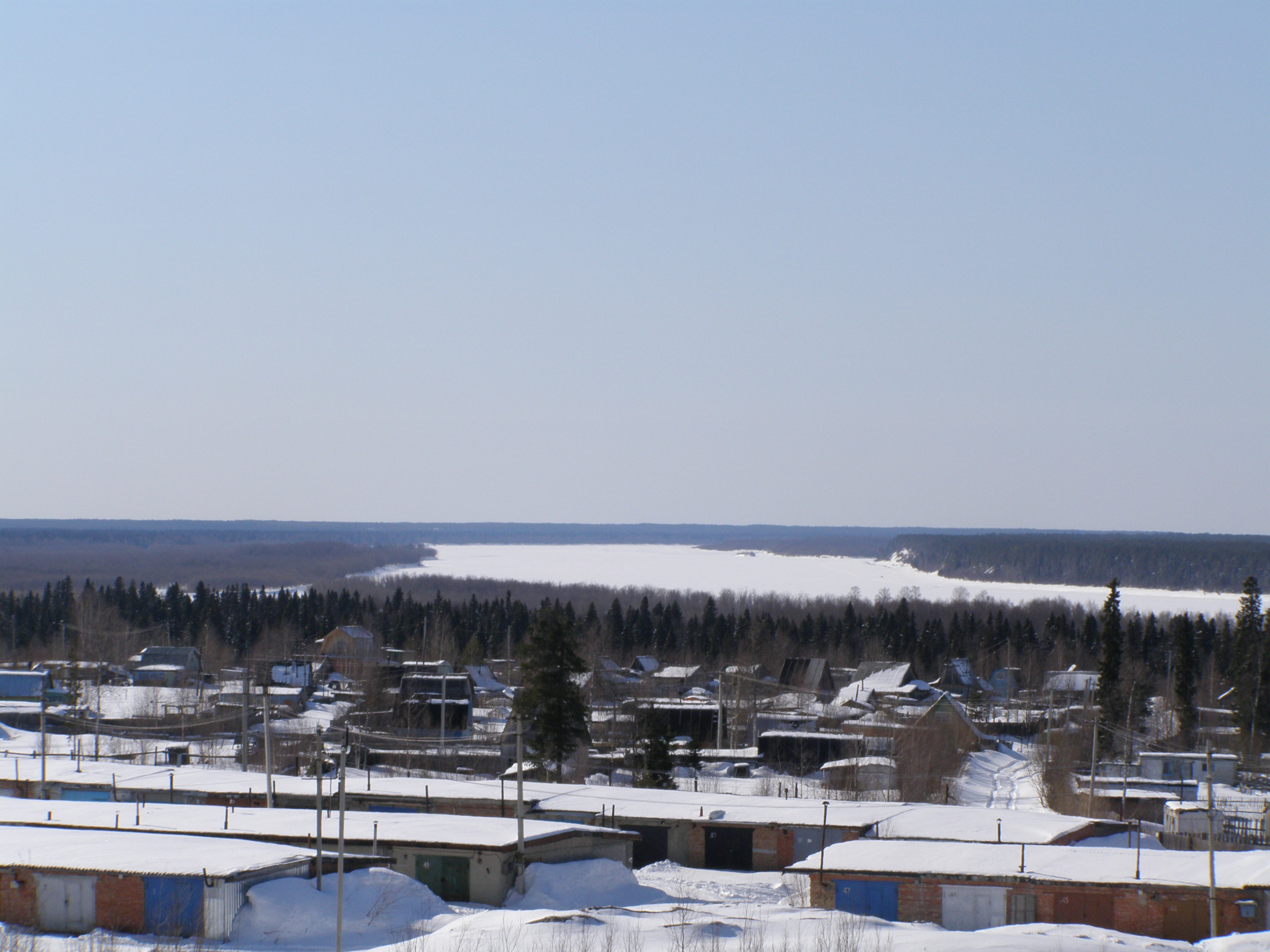
- View of Vuktyl

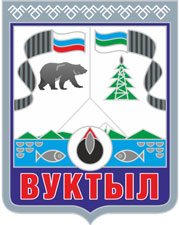
- Coat of arms
- Interactive map of Vuktyl
- Location of Vuktyl Vuktyl (Komi Republic)
- Coordinates: 63°42′N 57°19′E
- Country: Russia
- Federal subject: Komi Republic
- Founded: 1968
- Town status since: 1989

Population (2010 Census)
  - Total: 12,356
  - Estimate (2024): 9,001 (−27.2%)

Administrative status
  - Subordinated to: town of republic significance of Vuktyl
  - Capital of: town of republic significance of Vuktyl

Municipal status
  - Municipal district: Vuktyl Municipal District
  - Urban settlement: Vuktyl Urban Settlement
  - Capital of: Vuktyl Municipal District, Vuktyl Urban Settlement
- Time zone: UTC+3 (MSK)
- Postal code: 169570
- OKTMO ID: 87712000001
- Website: www.vuktyl.com

Vuktyl (Russian: Вукты́л, Komi: Вуктыл) is a town in the Komi Republic, Russia, located on the right bank of the Pechora River near its confluence with the Vuktyl River, 575 kilometers (357 mi) northeast of Syktyvkar, the capital of the republic. Population: 12,356 (2010 census); 14,472 (2002 census); 19,330 (1989 Soviet census).

== History ==
It was founded in 1968 and granted town status in 1989. A major oil pipeline runs from Vuktyl to Ukhta to Torzhok.

== Administrative and municipal status ==
Within the framework of administrative divisions, the town of Vuktyl is, together with four rural-type settlement administrative territories (comprising ten rural localities), incorporated as the town of republic significance of Vuktyl—an administrative unit with the status equal to that of the districts. As a municipal division, the town of republic significance of Vuktyl is incorporated as Vuktyl Municipal District; the town of Vuktyl is incorporated within it as Vuktyl Urban Settlement. The four rural-type settlement administrative territories are incorporated into four rural settlements within the municipal district.

== Transportation ==
The town is served by the Vuktyl Airport.

== See also ==
- List of airports in Russia
