= Northern Lights (pipeline) =

Russia-Belarus gas transporter

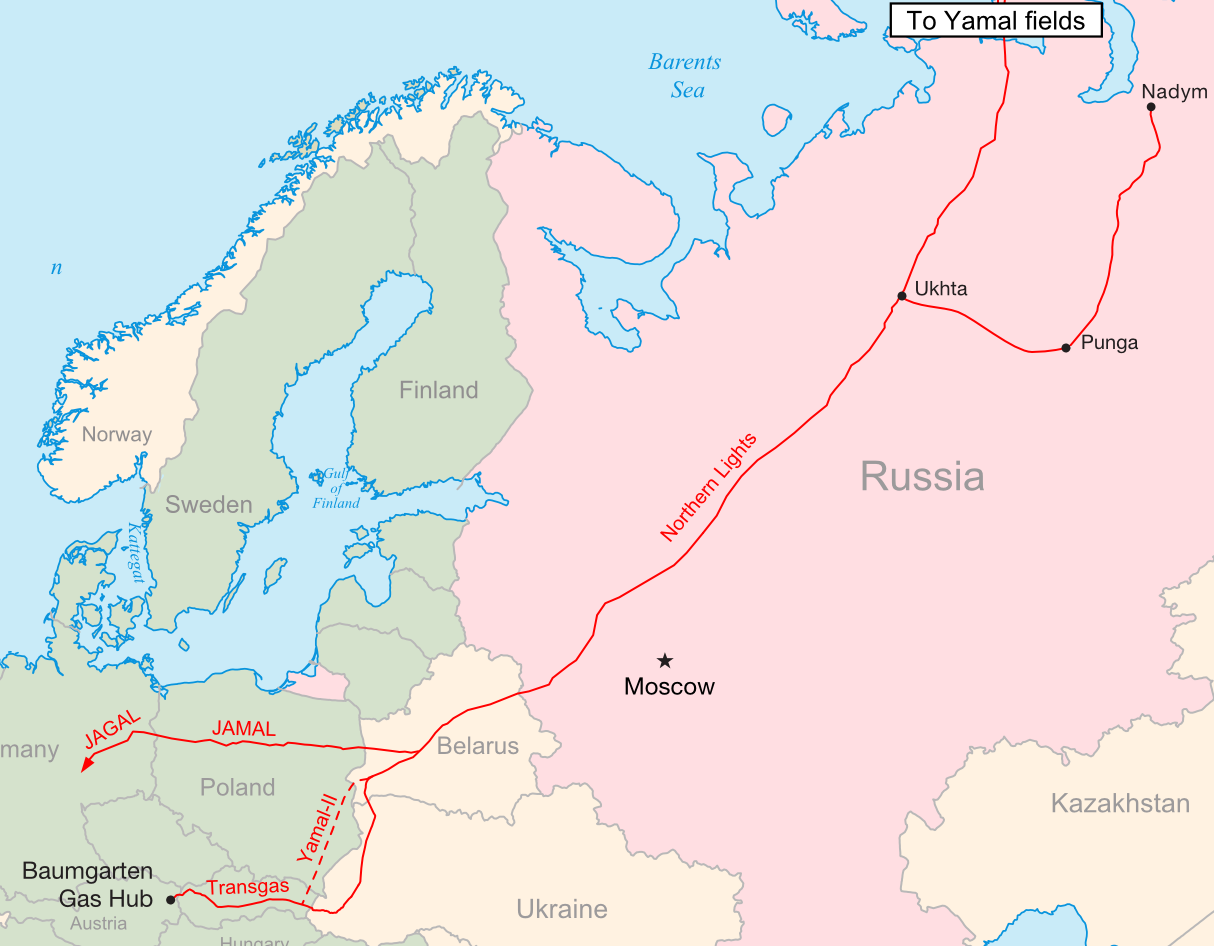
- Location of Northern Lights

Location
- Country: Russia, Belarus
- Direction: north-south-west
- Start: Urengoy gas field
- Passes through: Vuktyl, Ukhta, Gryazovets, Torzhok, Smolensk, Minsk
- Runs alongside: Yamal–Europe pipeline

General information
- Type: natural gas
- Operator: Gazprom, Beltransgaz
- Commissioned: 1985

Technical information
- Length: 7,377 km (4,584 mi)
- Maximum discharge: 51 billion cubic meters per year

Northern Lights (Russian: Сияние северa, Siyaniye Severa) is a natural gas pipeline system in Russia and Belarus. It is one of the main pipelines supplying north-western Russia and is an important transit route for Russian gas to Europe.

== History ==
The Northern Lights pipeline system was built in the Soviet Union from the 1960s to 1980s. Construction of the Vuktyl–Ukhta–Gryazovets–Torzhok section started in 1967 and was completed in 1969. By 1974, the pipeline had been extended to Minsk. The second main trunk line was added during the 1970s and by 1985, a third main trunk line had been built. Originally, gas was supplied by the Vukhtyl gas field, but later the pipeline was extended in order to connect with the Urengoy gas field.

== Technical description ==
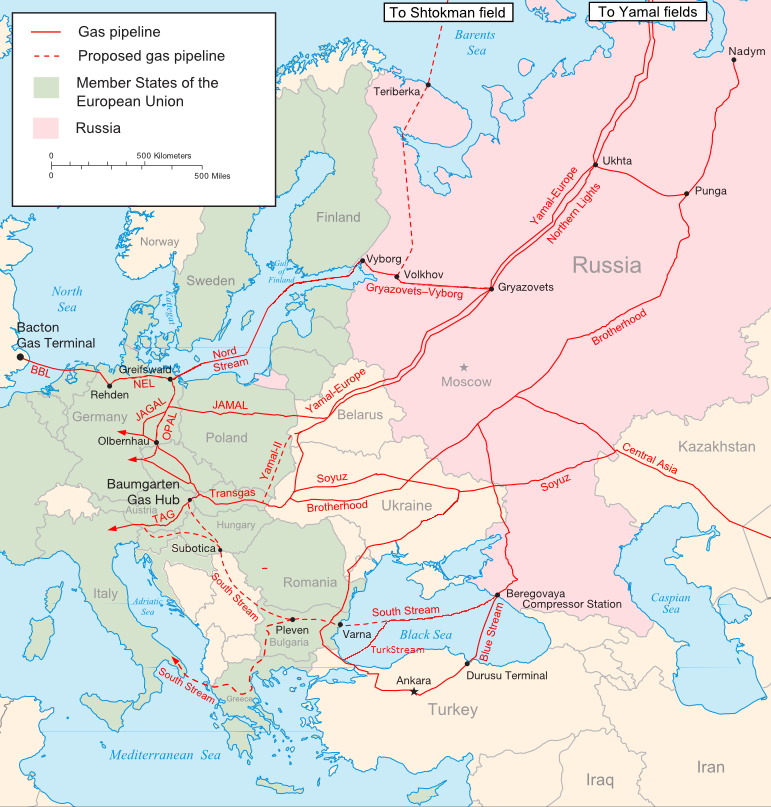
Gas pipelines from Russia to Europe

The Northern Lights pipeline system has a total length of 7,377 kilometres (4,584 mi), of which around 2,500 kilometres (1,600 mi) is used to transport Russian gas to Europe. The pipeline runs from the Urengoy gas field through Vuktyl, Ukhta, Gryazovets, Torzhok and Smolensk to Minsk in Belarus and from there to Poland, Ukraine and Lithuania. A part of the newer Yamal–Europe pipeline runs parallel to the Northern Lights pipeline. A branch line from Gryazovets through Saint Petersburg to Vyborg supplies the Saint Petersburg area and Finland. A third parallel line will be added to this branch to supply the Nord Stream 1 pipeline. In Torzhok, the Northern Lights pipeline intersects with the Moscow–Saint Petersburg pipeline supplying the Saint Petersburg area, Latvia and Estonia. The Minsk–Vilnius–Kaliningrad branch line supplies Lithuania and Kaliningrad Oblast while the Ivatsevichy-Dolyna branch line supplies Ukraine and the Kobrin-Brest-Warsaw branch line supplies Poland.

The system from Torzhok to the West consists of five major trunk pipelines:

Route	Length	Strings	Capacity	Diameter	Built in
Torzhok-Minsk-Ivatsevichy	454 km	3	45 bcm/year	1200 mm	1975–1983
Ivatsevichy-Dolyna (to Ukraine)	146 km	2		1220 mm	1976/1981
Kobrin-Brest-Warsaw (to Poland)	87 km	1		1020 mm	1985
Minsk-Vilnius (to Kaliningrad and Lithuania) see: Minsk–Kaliningrad Interconnection	196 km	1		1220 mm	1988
Torzhok-Dolyna (to Ukraine)	364 km	1		1420 mm	1994

This part of the system has 6 compressors stations. Its technical input capacity is 51 billion cubic meters (bcm) per year; however, due to the age of the pipeline system, its operational capability is estimated to be 46-48 bcm per year. In 2007, it transported 39 bcm of gas; 20.6 bcm to Belarus for domestic supply and 18.4 bcm for transit to Europe. The total amount of Russian gas transmitted through Belarus to Europe was 70.1 bcm in 2007.

== Ownership ==
The Russian section of the pipeline system is a part of the unified gas system of Russia and is owned and operated by Gazprom. The pipeline section on the territory of Belarus became Belarusian property after the dissolution of the Soviet Union, and is now owned and operated by Beltransgaz.
