= Gazprom Transgaz Belarus =

Belarusian natural gas company

- Native name: ОАО «Газпром трансгаз Беларусь»
- Predecessor: Zapadtransgaz; Beltransgaz
- Founded: 1992
- Headquarters: Minsk, Belarus
- Revenue: 8,223,758,000 Belarusian ruble (2021)
- Operating income: 766,698,000 Belarusian ruble (2021)
- Net income: 626,183,000 Belarusian ruble (2021)
- Total assets: 4,194,285,000 Belarusian ruble (2021)
- Number of employees: 6,357 (2021)
- Parent: Gazprom
- Website: www.btg.by

Gazprom Transgaz Belarus (former name: Beltransgaz) is a natural gas infrastructure and transportation company of Belarus. It operates the main natural gas transit pipelines through Belarus—Northern Lights and Yamal–Europe. Beltransgaz was founded in 1992 on the bases of Zapadtransgaz, a company responsible for the gas transit through Belarus. The company became 100% owned by the Russian gas company Gazprom in 2011.
