= Polushkino, Vologda Oblast =

Polushkino Полушкино
- Village
- Location within Vologda Oblast Location within Russia
- Coordinates: 59°02′N 40°33′E
- Country: Russia
- Region: Vologda Oblast
- District: Gryazovetsky District
- Time zone: UTC+3:00

Polushkino (Russian: Полушкино) is a rural locality (a village) in Komyanskoye Rural Settlement, Gryazovetsky District, Vologda Oblast, Russia. The population was 13 as of 2002.

== Geography ==
Polushkino is located 46 km northeast of Gryazovets (the district's administrative centre) by road. Pritykino is the nearest rural locality.
