= Zadorka =

Zadorka Задорка
- Village
- Location within Vologda Oblast Location within Russia
- Coordinates: 58°56′N 40°41′E
- Country: Russia
- Region: Vologda Oblast
- District: Gryazovetsky District
- Time zone: UTC+3:00

Zadorka (Russian: Задорка) is a rural locality (a village) in Sidorovskoye Rural Settlement, Gryazovetsky District, Vologda Oblast, Russia. The population was 5 as of 2002.

== Geography ==
Zadorka is located 41 km northeast of Gryazovets (the district's administrative centre) by road. Glubokoye is the nearest rural locality.
