= Tarshino =

Tarshino Таршино
- Village
- Location within Vologda Oblast Location within Russia
- Coordinates: 58°58′N 39°46′E
- Country: Russia
- Region: Vologda Oblast
- District: Gryazovetsky District
- Time zone: UTC+3:00

Tarshino (Russian: Таршино) is a rural locality (a village) in Yurovskoye Rural Settlement, Gryazovetsky District, Vologda Oblast, Russia. The population was 13 as of 2002.

== Geography ==
Tarshino is located 34 km northwest of Gryazovets (the district's administrative centre) by road. Minkino is the nearest rural locality.
