= Sitnikovo, Vologda Oblast =

Sitnikovo Ситниково
- Village
- Location within Vologda Oblast Location within Russia
- Coordinates: 58°43′N 40°17′E
- Country: Russia
- Region: Vologda Oblast
- District: Gryazovetsky District
- Time zone: UTC+3:00

Sitnikovo (Russian: Ситниково) is a rural locality (a village) in Rostilovskoye Rural Settlement, Gryazovetsky District, Vologda Oblast, Russia. The population was 5 as of 2002.

== Geography ==
Sitnikovo is located 18 kilometres (11 mi) south of Gryazovets (the district's administrative centre) by road. Sopelkino is the nearest rural locality.
