= Khaymino =

Khaymino Хаймино
- Village
- Location within Vologda Oblast Location within Russia
- Coordinates: 58°55′N 40°00′E
- Country: Russia
- Region: Vologda Oblast
- District: Gryazovetsky District
- Time zone: UTC+3:00

Khaymino (Russian: Хаймино) is a rural locality (a village) in Pertsevskoye Rural Settlement, Gryazovetsky District, Vologda Oblast, Russia. The population was 4 as of 2002.

== Geography ==
Khaymino is located 19 km (12 mi) northwest of Gryazovets (the district's administrative centre) by road. Slobodishcha is the nearest rural locality.
