= Vanchino =

Vanchino Ванчино
- Village
- Location within Vologda Oblast Location within Russia
- Coordinates: 58°45′N 40°55′E
- Country: Russia
- Region: Vologda Oblast
- District: Gryazovetsky District
- Time zone: UTC+3:00

Vanchino (Russian: Ванчино) is a rural locality (a village) in Sidorovskoye Rural Settlement, Gryazovetsky District, Vologda Oblast, Russia. The population was 2 as of 2002.

== Geography ==
Vanchino is located 47 km southeast of Gryazovets (the district's administrative centre) by road. Bakshino is the nearest rural locality.
