= Mokeyevo, Vologda Oblast =

Mokeyevo Мокеево
- Village
- Location within Vologda Oblast Location within Russia
- Coordinates: 58°57′N 40°00′E
- Country: Russia
- Region: Vologda Oblast
- District: Gryazovetsky District
- Time zone: UTC+3:00

Mokeyevo (Russian: Мокеево) is a rural locality (a village) in Yurovskoye Rural Settlement, Gryazovetsky District, Vologda Oblast, Russia. The population was 1 as of 2002.

== Geography ==
Mokeyevo is located 19 km northwest of Gryazovets (the district's administrative centre) by road. Dudenevo is the nearest rural locality.
