= Korotygino =

Korotygino Коротыгино
- Village
- Location within Vologda Oblast Location within Russia
- Coordinates: 58°59′N 39°54′E
- Country: Russia
- Region: Vologda Oblast
- District: Gryazovetsky District
- Time zone: UTC+3:00

Korotygino (Russian: Коротыгино) is a rural locality (a village) in Yurovskoye Rural Settlement, Gryazovetsky District, Vologda Oblast, Russia. The population was 188 as of 2002. There are 2 streets.

== Geography ==
Korotygino is located 28 km (17 mi) northwest of Gryazovets (the district's administrative centre) by road. Andrakovo is the nearest rural locality.
