= Chukharitsa =

Chukharitsa Чухарица
- Village
- Location within Vologda Oblast Location within Russia
- Coordinates: 58°49′N 41°01′E
- Country: Russia
- Region: Vologda Oblast
- District: Gryazovetsky District
- Time zone: UTC+3:00

Chukharitsa (Russian: Чухарица) is a rural locality (a village) in Vokhtozhskoye Rural Settlement, Gryazovetsky District, Vologda Oblast, Russia. The population was 135 as of 2002.

== Geography ==
Chukharitsa is located 59 km (37 mi) southeast of Gryazovets (the district's administrative centre) by road. Vokhtoga is the nearest rural locality.
