= Anopino, Vologda Oblast =

Anopino Анопино
- Village
- Location within Vologda Oblast Location within Russia
- Coordinates: 58°55′N 40°04′E
- Country: Russia
- Region: Vologda Oblast
- District: Gryazovetsky District
- Time zone: UTC+3:00

Anopino (Russian: Анопино) is a rural locality (a village) in Yurovskoye Rural Settlement, Gryazovetsky District, Vologda Oblast, Russia. The population was 14 as of 2002.

== Geography ==
Anopino is located 14 km (8.7 mi) northwest of Gryazovets (the district's administrative centre) by road. Gribovo is the nearest rural locality.
