= Ivnyak =

Ivnyak Ивняк
- Village
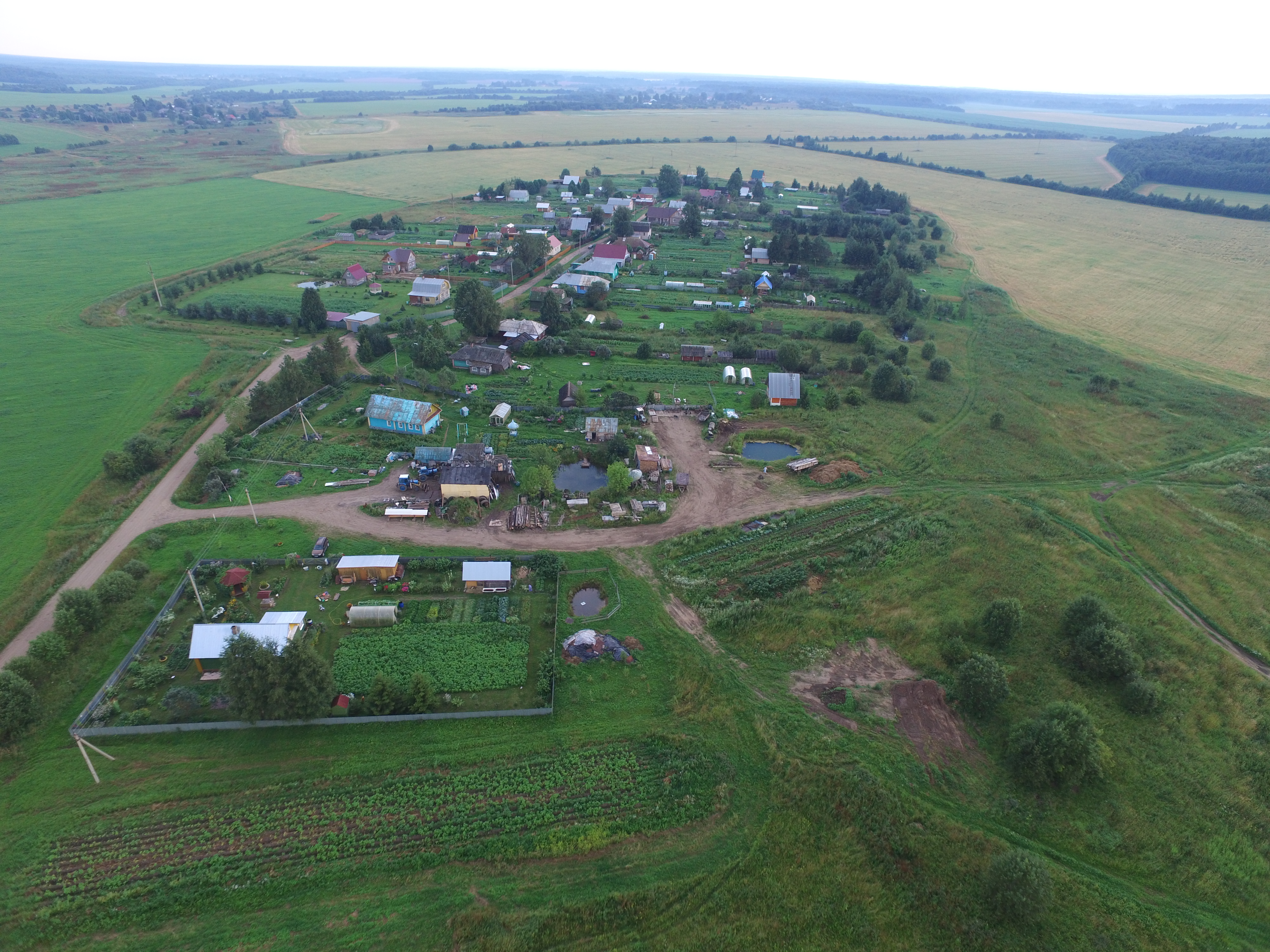

- Location within Vologda Oblast Location within Russia
- Coordinates: 59°04′N 40°22′E
- Country: Russia
- Region: Vologda Oblast
- District: Gryazovetsky District
- Time zone: UTC+3:00

Ivnyak (Russian: Ивняк) is a rural locality (a village) in Komyanskoye Rural Settlement, Gryazovetsky District, Vologda Oblast, Russia. The population was 11 as of 2002.

== Geography ==
Ivnyak is located 30 km (19 mi) northeast of Gryazovets (the district's administrative centre) by road. Zarechye is the nearest rural locality.
