= Arkatovo =

Arkatovo Аркатово
- Village
- Location within Vologda Oblast Location within Russia
- Coordinates: 58°33′N 40°30′E
- Country: Russia
- Region: Vologda Oblast
- District: Gryazovetsky District
- Time zone: UTC+3:00

Arkatovo (Russian: Аркатово) is a rural locality (a village) in Rostilovskoye Rural Settlement, Gryazovetsky District, Vologda Oblast, Russia. The population was 10 as of 2002.

== Geography ==
Arkatovo is located 44 km (27 mi) south of Gryazovets (the district's administrative centre) by road. Chistopyanovo is the nearest rural locality.
