= Bushuikha (station) =

Bushuikha Бушуиха
- Station
- Location within Vologda Oblast Location within Russia
- Coordinates: 59°01′N 40°27′E
- Country: Russia
- Region: Vologda Oblast
- District: Gryazovetsky District
- Time zone: UTC+3:00

Bushuikha (Russian: Бушуиха) is a rural locality (a station) in Komyanskoye Rural Settlement, Gryazovetsky District, Vologda Oblast, Russia. The population was 437 as of 2002.

== Geography ==
It is located 38 km (24 mi) northeast of Gryazovets (the district's administrative centre) by road. Bushuikha (village) is the nearest rural locality.
