= Maklakovo, Vologda Oblast =

Maklakovo Маклаково
- Village
- Location within Vologda Oblast Location within Russia
- Coordinates: 58°58′N 40°36′E
- Country: Russia
- Region: Vologda Oblast
- District: Gryazovetsky District
- Time zone: UTC+3:00

Maklakovo (Russian: Маклаково) is a rural locality (a village) in Pertsevskoye Rural Settlement, Gryazovetsky District, Vologda Oblast, Russia. The population was 12 as of 2002.

== Geography ==
Maklakovo is located 43 km northeast of Gryazovets (the district's administrative centre) by road. Stanovoye is the nearest rural locality.
