= Pogiblovo =

Pogiblovo Погиблово
- Village
- Location within Vologda Oblast Location within Russia
- Coordinates: 58°50′N 39°59′E
- Country: Russia
- Region: Vologda Oblast
- District: Gryazovetsky District
- Time zone: UTC+3:00

Pogiblovo (Russian: Погиблово) is a rural locality (a village) in Yurovskoye Rural Settlement, Gryazovetsky District, Vologda Oblast, Russia. The population was 4 as of 2002.

== Geography ==
Pogiblovo is located 18 km west of Gryazovets (the district's administrative centre) by road. Dyakovo is the nearest rural locality.
