= Fedyaykino =

Fedyaykino Федяйкино
- Village
- Location within Vologda Oblast Location within Russia
- Coordinates: 59°00′N 40°16′E
- Country: Russia
- Region: Vologda Oblast
- District: Gryazovetsky District
- Time zone: UTC+3:00

Fedyaykino (Russian: Федяйкино) is a rural locality (a village) in Komyanskoye Rural Settlement, Gryazovetsky District, Vologda Oblast, Russia. The population was 9 as of 2002.

== Geography ==
Fedyaykino is located 21 km (13 mi) north of Gryazovets (the district's administrative centre) by road. Anankino is the nearest rural locality.
