= Nikola-Penye =

Nikola-Penye Никола-Пенье
- Village
- Location within Vologda Oblast Location within Russia
- Coordinates: 58°47′N 40°19′E
- Country: Russia
- Region: Vologda Oblast
- District: Gryazovetsky District
- Time zone: UTC+3:00

Nikola-Penye (Russian: Никола-Пенье) is a rural locality (a village) in Rostilovskoye Rural Settlement, Gryazovetsky District, Vologda Oblast, Russia. The population was 8 as of 2002.

== Geography ==
Nikola-Penye is located 13 km southeast of Gryazovets (the district's administrative centre) by road. Skorodumka is the nearest rural locality.
