= Bolshoye Kosikovo =

Bolshoye Kosikovo Большое Косиково
- Village
- Location within Vologda Oblast Location within Russia
- Coordinates: 58°46′N 40°16′E
- Country: Russia
- Region: Vologda Oblast
- District: Gryazovetsky District
- Time zone: UTC+3:00

Bolshoye Kosikovo (Russian: Большое Косиково) is a rural locality (a village) in Rostilovskoye Rural Settlement, Gryazovetsky District, Vologda Oblast, Russia. The population was 63 as of 2002.

== Geography ==
Bolshoye Kosikovo is located 13 km (8.1 mi) south of Gryazovets (the district's administrative centre) by road. Studenets is the nearest rural locality.
