= Bubeykino =

Bubeykino Бубейкино
- Village
- Location within Vologda Oblast Location within Russia
- Coordinates: 58°45′N 40°51′E
- Country: Russia
- Region: Vologda Oblast
- District: Gryazovetsky District
- Time zone: UTC+3:00

Bubeykino (Russian: Бубейкино) is a rural locality (a village) in Sidorovskoye Rural Settlement, Gryazovetsky District, Vologda Oblast, Russia. The population was 8 as of 2002.

== Geography ==
Bubeykino is located 47 km (29 mi) southeast of Gryazovets (the district's administrative centre) by road. Markashovo is the nearest rural locality.
