= Chernetskoye, Gryazovetsky District, Vologda Oblast =

Chernetskoye Чернецкое
- Selo
- Location within Vologda Oblast Location within Russia
- Coordinates: 58°52′N 40°01′E
- Country: Russia
- Region: Vologda Oblast
- District: Gryazovetsky District
- Time zone: UTC+3:00

Chernetskoye (Russian: Чернецкое) is a rural locality (a selo) in Yurovskoye Rural Settlement, Gryazovetsky District, Vologda Oblast, Russia. The population was 43 as of 2002.

== Geography ==
Chernetskoye is located 16 km (9.9 mi) west of Gryazovets (the district's administrative centre) by road. Skorodumka is the nearest rural locality.
