= Spas-Nurma =

Spas-Nurma Спас-Нурма
- Village
- Location within Vologda Oblast Location within Russia
- Coordinates: 58°43′N 40°22′E
- Country: Russia
- Region: Vologda Oblast
- District: Gryazovetsky District
- Time zone: UTC+3:00

Spas-Nurma (Russian: Спас-Нурма) is a rural locality (a village) in Rostilovskoye Rural Settlement, Gryazovetsky District, Vologda Oblast, Russia. The population was 3 as of 2002.

== Geography ==
Spas-Nurma is located 21 km south of Gryazovets (the district's administrative centre) by road. Dor is the nearest locality.
