= Obraztsovo, Gryazovetsky District, Vologda Oblast =

Obraztsovo Образцово
- Village
- Location within Vologda Oblast Location within Russia
- Coordinates: 58°33′N 40°31′E
- Country: Russia
- Region: Vologda Oblast
- District: Gryazovetsky District
- Time zone: UTC+3:00

Obraztsovo (Russian: Образцово) is a rural locality (a village) in Rostilovskoye Rural Settlement, Gryazovetsky District, Vologda Oblast, Russia. The population was 2 as of 2002.

== Geography ==
Obraztsovo is located 44 km south of Gryazovets (the district's administrative centre) by road. Arkatovo is the nearest rural locality.
