= Krutets, Gryazovetsky District, Vologda Oblast =

Krutets Крутец
- Village
- Location within Vologda Oblast Location within Russia
- Coordinates: 58°59′N 40°24′E
- Country: Russia
- Region: Vologda Oblast
- District: Gryazovetsky District
- Time zone: UTC+3:00

Krutets (Russian: Крутец) is a rural locality (a village) in Komyanskoye Rural Settlement, Gryazovetsky District, Vologda Oblast, Russia. The population was 17 as of 2002.

== Geography ==
Krutets is located 28 km (17 mi) northeast of Gryazovets (the district's administrative centre) by road. Yevsyukovo is the nearest rural locality.
