= Polovoz =

Polovoz Половоз
- Village
- Location within Vologda Oblast Location within Russia
- Coordinates: 58°43′N 40°19′E
- Country: Russia
- Region: Vologda Oblast
- District: Gryazovetsky District
- Time zone: UTC+3:00

Polovoz (Russian: Половоз) is a rural locality (a village) in Rostilovskoye Rural Settlement, Gryazovetsky District, Vologda Oblast, Russia. The population was 26 as of 2002.

== Geography ==
Polovoz is located 19 km south of Gryazovets (the district's administrative centre) by road. Dor is the nearest rural locality.
