= Kastikha =

Kastikha Кастиха
- Village
- Location within Vologda Oblast Location within Russia
- Coordinates: 58°37′N 40°16′E
- Country: Russia
- Region: Vologda Oblast
- District: Gryazovetsky District
- Time zone: UTC+3:00

Kastikha (Russian: Кастиха) is a rural locality (a village) in Rostilovskoye Rural Settlement, Gryazovetsky District, Vologda Oblast, Russia. The population was 4 as of 2002.

== Geography ==
Kastikha is located 33 km (21 mi) south of Gryazovets (the district's administrative centre) by road. Ploskoye is the nearest rural locality.
