= Polukhino =

Polukhino Полухино
- Village
- Location within Vologda Oblast Location within Russia
- Coordinates: 58°43′N 40°59′E
- Country: Russia
- Region: Vologda Oblast
- District: Gryazovetsky District
- Time zone: UTC+3:00

Polukhino (Russian: Полухино) is a rural locality (a village) in Sidorovskoye Rural Settlement, Gryazovetsky District, Vologda Oblast, Russia. The population was 5 as of 2002.

== Geography ==
Polukhino is located 55 km southeast of Gryazovets (the district's administrative centre) by road. Stepanovo is the nearest rural locality.
