= Mukhino, Gryazovetsky District, Vologda Oblast =

Mukhino Мухино
- Village
- Location within Vologda Oblast Location within Russia
- Coordinates: 58°53′N 40°50′E
- Country: Russia
- Region: Vologda Oblast
- District: Gryazovetsky District
- Time zone: UTC+3:00

Mukhino (Russian: Мухино) is a rural locality (a village) in Sidorovskoye Rural Settlement, Gryazovetsky District, Vologda Oblast, Russia. The population was 11 as of 2002.

== Geography ==
Mukhino is located 46 km east of Gryazovets (the district's administrative centre) by road. Kolotilikha is the nearest rural locality.
