= Skalino (station) =

Skalino Скалино
- Station
- Location within Vologda Oblast Location within Russia
- Coordinates: 58°32′N 40°12′E
- Country: Russia
- Region: Vologda Oblast
- District: Gryazovetsky District
- Time zone: UTC+3:00

Skalino (Russian: Скалино) is a rural locality (a station) in Rostilovskoye Rural Settlement, Gryazovetsky District, Vologda Oblast, Russia. The population was 10 as of 2002.

== Geography ==
The distance to Gryazovets is 45 km, to Rostilovo is 29 km. Vislyakovo is the nearest rural locality.
