= Zhelominino =

Zhelominino Желоминино
- Village
- Location within Vologda Oblast Location within Russia
- Coordinates: 58°50′N 40°07′E
- Country: Russia
- Region: Vologda Oblast
- District: Gryazovetsky District
- Time zone: UTC+3:00

Zhelominino (Russian: Желоминино) is a rural locality (a village) in Yurovskoye Rural Settlement, Gryazovetsky District, Vologda Oblast, Russia. The population was 4 as of 2002.

== Geography ==
Zhelominino is located 15 km southwest of Gryazovets (the district's administrative centre) by road. Starovo is the nearest rural locality.
