= Rakovo, Vologda Oblast =

Rakovo Раково
- Village
- Location within Vologda Oblast Location within Russia
- Coordinates: 58°51′N 40°38′E
- Country: Russia
- Region: Vologda Oblast
- District: Gryazovetsky District
- Time zone: UTC+3:00

Rakovo (Russian: Раково) is a rural locality (a village) in Pertsevskoye Rural Settlement, Gryazovetsky District, Vologda Oblast, Russia. The population was 1 as of 2002.

== Geography ==
Rakovo is located 25 km east of Gryazovets (the district's administrative centre) by road. Gridino is the nearest rural locality.
