= Vasilevo, Gryazovetsky District, Vologda Oblast =

Vasilevo Василево
- Village
- Location within Vologda Oblast Location within Russia
- Coordinates: 59°02′N 40°15′E
- Country: Russia
- Region: Vologda Oblast
- District: Gryazovetsky District
- Time zone: UTC+3:00

Vasilevo (Russian: Василево) is a rural locality (a village) in Komyanskoye Rural Settlement, Gryazovetsky District, Vologda Oblast, Russia. The population was 8 as of 2002.

== Geography ==
Vasilevo is located 24 km north of Gryazovets (the district's administrative centre) by road. Kuznetsovo is the nearest rural locality.
