= Ostanino, Gryazovetsky District, Vologda Oblast =

Ostanino Останино
- Village
- Location within Vologda Oblast Location within Russia
- Coordinates: 58°51′N 40°20′E
- Country: Russia
- Region: Vologda Oblast
- District: Gryazovetsky District
- Time zone: UTC+3:00

Ostanino (Russian: Останино) is a rural locality (a village) in Pertsevskoye Rural Settlement, Gryazovetsky District, Vologda Oblast, Russia. The population was 5 as of 2002.

== Geography ==
Ostanino is located 7 km southeast of Gryazovets (the district's administrative centre) by road. Gryazovets is the nearest rural locality.
