= Basarigino =

Basarigino Басаргино
- Village
- Location within Vologda Oblast Location within Russia
- Coordinates: 58°48′N 40°15′E
- Country: Russia
- Region: Vologda Oblast
- District: Gryazovetsky District
- Time zone: UTC+3:00

Basarigino (Russian: Басаргино) is a rural locality (a village) in Rostilovskoye Rural Settlement, Gryazovetsky District, Vologda Oblast, Russia. The population was 15 as of 2002.

== Geography ==
Basarigino is located 8 km (5.0 mi) south of Gryazovets (the district's administrative centre) by road. Rostilovo is the nearest rural locality.
