= Tufanovo (station) =

Tufanovo Туфаново
- Station
- Location within Vologda Oblast Location within Russia
- Coordinates: 59°03′N 40°18′E
- Country: Russia
- Region: Vologda Oblast
- District: Gryazovetsky District
- Time zone: UTC+3:00

Tufanovo (Russian: Туфаново) is a rural locality (a station) in Komyanskoye Rural Settlement, Gryazovetsky District, Vologda Oblast, Russia. The population was 49 as of 2002.

== Geography ==
Tufanovo is located 27 km north of Gryazovets (the district's administrative centre) by road. Maloye Denisyevo is the nearest rural locality.
