= Yurovo, Gryazovetsky District, Vologda Oblast =

Yurovo Юрово
- Village
- Location within Vologda Oblast Location within Russia
- Coordinates: 58°58′N 39°59′E
- Country: Russia
- Region: Vologda Oblast
- District: Gryazovetsky District
- Time zone: UTC+3:00

Yurovo (Russian: Юрово) is a rural locality (a village) and the administrative center of Yurovskoye Rural Settlement, Gryazovetsky District, Vologda Oblast, Russia. The population was 762 as of 2002. There are 7 streets.

== Geography ==
Yurovo is located 21 km northwest of Gryazovets (the district's administrative centre) by road. Krivodino is the nearest rural locality.
