= Kuksimovo =

Kuksimovo Куксимово
- Village
- Location within Vologda Oblast Location within Russia
- Coordinates: 59°02′N 39°53′E
- Country: Russia
- Region: Vologda Oblast
- District: Gryazovetsky District
- Time zone: UTC+3:00

Kuksimovo (Russian: Куксимово) is a rural locality (a village) in Yurovskoye Rural Settlement, Gryazovetsky District, Vologda Oblast, Russia. The population was 5 as of 2002.

== Geography ==
Kuksimovo is located 40 km (25 mi) northwest of Gryazovets (the district's administrative centre) by road. Osipovo is the nearest rural locality.
