= Fetinino, Gryazovetsky District, Vologda Oblast =

Fetinino Фетинино
- Village
- Location within Vologda Oblast Location within Russia
- Coordinates: 58°46′N 40°03′E
- Country: Russia
- Region: Vologda Oblast
- District: Gryazovetsky District
- Time zone: UTC+3:00

Fetinino (Russian: Фетинино) is a rural locality (a village) in Yurovskoye Rural Settlement, Gryazovetsky District, Vologda Oblast, Russia. The population was 17 as of 2002.

== Geography ==
Fetinino is located 33 km (21 mi) southwest of Gryazovets (the district's administrative centre) by road. Plyushchevo is the nearest rural locality.
