= Abanino =

Abanino Абанино
- Village
- Location within Vologda Oblast Location within Russia
- Coordinates: 58°42′N 40°19′E
- Country: Russia
- Region: Vologda Oblast
- District: Gryazovetsky District
- Time zone: [[UTC+3:00]]

Abanino (Russian: Абанино) is a rural locality (a village) in Rostilovskoye Rural Settlement of Gryazovetsky District, Vologda Oblast, Russia. The population was 14 as of 2002.

== Geography ==
Abanino is located 20 km (12 mi) south of Gryazovets (the district's administrative centre) by road. Sopelkino is the nearest rural locality.
