= Nizhnyaya Pustyn =

Nizhnyaya Pustyn Нижняя Пустынь
- Village
- Location within Vologda Oblast Location within Russia
- Coordinates: 58°49′N 40°58′E
- Country: Russia
- Region: Vologda Oblast
- District: Gryazovetsky District
- Time zone: UTC+3:00

Nizhnyaya Pustyn (Russian: Нижняя Пустынь) is a rural locality (a village) in Vokhtozhskoye Rural Settlement, Gryazovetsky District, Vologda Oblast, Russia. The population was 1 as of 2002.

== Geography ==
Nizhnyaya Pustyn is located 65 km east of Gryazovets (the district's administrative centre) by road. Verhnyaya Pustyn is the nearest rural locality.
