= Rzhishcha =

Rzhishcha Ржища
- Village
- Location within Vologda Oblast Location within Russia
- Coordinates: 58°52′N 40°31′E
- Country: Russia
- Region: Vologda Oblast
- District: Gryazovetsky District
- Time zone: UTC+3:00

Rzhishcha (Russian: Ржища) is a rural locality (a village) in Pertsevskoye Rural Settlement, Gryazovetsky District, Vologda Oblast, Russia. The population was 7 as of 2002.

== Geography ==
Rzhishcha is located 20 km east of Gryazovets (the district's administrative centre) by road. Melenka is the nearest rural locality.
