= Kirpichny Zavod, Vologda Oblast =

Kirpichny Zavod Кирпичный Завод
- Settlement
- Location within Vologda Oblast Location within Russia
- Coordinates: 59°08′N 41°26′E
- Country: Russia
- Region: Vologda Oblast
- District: Gryazovetsky District
- Time zone: UTC+3:00

Kirpichny Zavod (Russian: Кирпичный Завод) is a rural locality (a settlement) in Vokhtozhskoye Rural Settlement, Gryazovetsky District, Vologda Oblast, Russia. The population was 104 as of 2002.

== Geography ==
Kirpichny Zavod is located 116 km (72 mi) northeast of Gryazovets (the district's administrative centre) by road. Kamenka is the nearest rural locality.
