= Aleksino, Gryazovetsky District, Vologda Oblast =

Aleksino Алексино
- Village
- Location within Vologda Oblast Location within Russia
- Coordinates: 58°46′N 40°58′E
- Country: Russia
- Region: Vologda Oblast
- District: Gryazovetsky District
- Time zone: UTC+3:00

Aleksino (Russian: Алексино) is a rural locality (a village) in Sidorovskoye Rural Settlement, Gryazovetsky District, Vologda Oblast, Russia. The population was 18 as of 2002.

== Geography ==
Aleksino is located 52 km (32 mi) southeast of Gryazovets (the district's administrative centre) by road. Pankratovo is the nearest rural locality.
