= Ploskoye, Gryazovetsky District, Vologda Oblast =

Ploskoye Плоское
- Settlement
- Location within Vologda Oblast Location within Russia
- Coordinates: 58°38′N 40°16′E
- Country: Russia
- Region: Vologda Oblast
- District: Gryazovetsky District
- Time zone: UTC+3:00

Ploskoye (Russian: Плоское) is a rural locality (a settlement) in Rostilovskoye Rural Settlement, Gryazovetsky District, Vologda Oblast, Russia. The population was 562 as of 2002. There are 8 streets.

== Geography ==
Ploskoye is located 31 km south of Gryazovets (the district's administrative centre) by road. Pochinok is the nearest rural locality.
