= Gora, Gryazovetsky District, Vologda Oblast =

Gora Гора
- Village
- Location within Vologda Oblast Location within Russia
- Coordinates: 59°05′N 40°25′E
- Country: Russia
- Region: Vologda Oblast
- District: Gryazovetsky District
- Time zone: UTC+3:00

Gora (Russian: Гора) is a rural locality (a village) in Komyanskoye Rural Settlement, Gryazovetsky District, Vologda Oblast, Russia. The population was 18 as of 2002.

== Geography ==
Gora is located 34 km (21 mi) northeast of Gryazovets (the district's administrative centre) by road. Zimnyak is the nearest rural locality.
