= Shaldanovo =

Shaldanovo Шалданово
- Village
- Location within Vologda Oblast Location within Russia
- Coordinates: 58°36′N 40°29′E
- Country: Russia
- Region: Vologda Oblast
- District: Gryazovetsky District
- Time zone: UTC+3:00

Shaldanovo (Russian: Шалданово) is a rural locality (a village) in Rostilovskoye Rural Settlement, Gryazovetsky District, Vologda Oblast, Russia. The population was 4 as of 2002.

== Geography ==
Shaldanovo is located 39 km south of Gryazovets (the district's administrative centre) by road. Pechennikovo is the nearest rural locality.
