= Tsepelka =

Tsepelka Цепелка
- Village
- Location within Vologda Oblast Location within Russia
- Coordinates: 58°43′N 40°59′E
- Country: Russia
- Region: Vologda Oblast
- District: Gryazovetsky District
- Time zone: UTC+3:00

Tsepelka (Russian: Цепелка) is a rural locality (a village) in Sidorovskoye Rural Settlement, Gryazovetsky District, Vologda Oblast, Russia. The population was 12 as of 2002.

== Geography ==
Tsepelka is located 54 km southeast of Gryazovets (the district's administrative centre) by road. Ivonino is the nearest rural locality.
