= Telebino =

Telebino Телебино
- Village
- Location within Vologda Oblast Location within Russia
- Coordinates: 58°46′N 39°53′E
- Country: Russia
- Region: Vologda Oblast
- District: Gryazovetsky District
- Time zone: UTC+3:00

Telebino (Russian: Телебино) is a rural locality (a village) in Yurovskoye Rural Settlement, Gryazovetsky District, Vologda Oblast, Russia. The population was 1 as of 2002.

== Geography ==
Telebino is located 28 km southwest of Gryazovets (the district's administrative centre) by road. Kurazh is the nearest rural locality.
