= Balagurovo =

Balagurovo Балагурово
- Village
- Location within Vologda Oblast Location within Russia
- Coordinates: 58°57′N 39°50′E
- Country: Russia
- Region: Vologda Oblast
- District: Gryazovetsky District
- Time zone: UTC+3:00

Balagurovo (Russian: Балагурово) is a rural locality (a village) in Yurovskoye Rural Settlement, Gryazovetsky District, Vologda Oblast, Russia. The population was 4 as of 2002.

== Geography ==
Balagurovo is located 35 km (22 mi) northwest of Gryazovets (the district's administrative centre) by road. Piterimka is the nearest rural locality.
