= Velikoretsky Lipovik =

Velikoretsky Lipovik Великорецкий Липовик
- Village
- Location within Vologda Oblast Location within Russia
- Coordinates: 59°04′N 40°33′E
- Country: Russia
- Region: Vologda Oblast
- District: Gryazovetsky District
- Time zone: UTC+3:00

Velikoretsky Lipovik (Russian: Великорецкий Липовик) is a rural locality (a village) in Komyansky Rural Settlement, Gryazovetsky District, Vologda Oblast, Russia. The population was 8 as of 2002.

== Geography ==
Velikoretsky Lipovik is located 46 km northeast of Gryazovets (the district's administrative centre) by road. Kiselevo is the nearest rural locality.
