= Parshino, Gryazovetsky District, Vologda Oblast =

Parshino Паршино
- Village
- Location within Vologda Oblast Location within Russia
- Coordinates: 58°53′N 40°32′E
- Country: Russia
- Region: Vologda Oblast
- District: Gryazovetsky District
- Time zone: UTC+3:00

Parshino (Russian: Паршино) is a rural locality (a village) in Pertsevskoye Rural Settlement, Gryazovetsky District, Vologda Oblast, Russia. The population was 63 as of 2002.

== Geography ==
Parshino is located 24 km northeast of Gryazovets (the district's administrative centre) by road. Klimovo is the nearest rural locality.
