= Volnoye-Syrishchevo =

Volnoye-Syrishchevo Вольное-Сырищево
- Village
- Location within Vologda Oblast Location within Russia
- Coordinates: 59°06′N 40°28′E
- Country: Russia
- Region: Vologda Oblast
- District: Gryazovetsky District
- Time zone: UTC+3:00

Volnoye-Syrishchevo (Russian: Вольное-Сырищево) is a rural locality (a village) in Komyanskoye Rural Settlement, Gryazovetsky District, Vologda Oblast, Russia. The population was 4 as of 2002.

== Geography ==
Volnoye-Syrishchevo is located 39 km northeast of Gryazovets (the district's administrative centre) by road. Nekhotovo is the nearest locality. nearest lake Maurinsko with 4 village Maurino and mount Maura in region connecting with a line form a bracket
