= Khoroshevo, Gryazovetsky District, Vologda Oblast =

Khoroshevo Хорошево
- Village
- Location within Vologda Oblast Location within Russia
- Coordinates: 59°01′N 40°16′E
- Country: Russia
- Region: Vologda Oblast
- District: Gryazovetsky District
- Time zone: UTC+3:00

Khoroshevo (Russian: Хорошево) is a rural locality (a village) and the administrative center of Komyanskoye Rural Settlement, Gryazovetsky District, Vologda Oblast, Russia. The population was 924 as of 2002. There are 6 streets.

== Geography ==
Khoroshevo is located 21 km (13 mi) north of Gryazovets (the district's administrative centre) by road. Yudino is the nearest rural locality.
