= Kameshnik, Gryazovetsky District, Vologda Oblast =

Kameshnik Камешник
- Village
- Location within Vologda Oblast Location within Russia
- Coordinates: 58°55′N 40°14′E
- Country: Russia
- Region: Vologda Oblast
- District: Gryazovetsky District
- Time zone: UTC+3:00

Kameshnik (Russian: Камешник) is a rural locality (a village) in Pertsevskoye Rural Settlement, Gryazovetsky District, Vologda Oblast, Russia. The population was 76 as of 2002.

== Geography ==
Kameshnik is located 6 km (3.7 mi) north of Gryazovets (the district's administrative centre) by road. Dyukosovo is the nearest rural locality.
