= Sementsevo =

Sementsevo Семенцево
- Village
- Location within Vologda Oblast Location within Russia
- Coordinates: 58°38′N 40°20′E
- Country: Russia
- Region: Vologda Oblast
- District: Gryazovetsky District
- Time zone: UTC+3:00

Sementsevo (Russian: Семенцево) is a rural locality (a village) in Rostilovskoye Rural Settlement, Gryazovetsky District, Vologda Oblast, Russia. The population was 34 as of 2002.

== Geography ==
Sementsevo is located 29 km south of Gryazovets (the district's administrative centre) by road. Anosovo is the nearest rural locality.
