= Chagrino =

Chagrino Чагрино
- Village
- Location within Vologda Oblast Location within Russia
- Coordinates: 59°03′N 40°17′E
- Country: Russia
- Region: Vologda Oblast
- District: Gryazovetsky District
- Time zone: UTC+3:00

Chagrino (Russian: Чагрино) is a rural locality (a village) in Komyanskoye Rural Settlement, Gryazovetsky District, Vologda Oblast, Russia. The population was 1 as of 2002.

== Geography ==
Chagrino is located 25 km (16 mi) north of Gryazovets (the district's administrative centre) by road. Bolshoye Denisyevo is the nearest rural locality.
