= Uglentsevo =

Uglentsevo Угленцево
- Village
- Location within Vologda Oblast Location within Russia
- Coordinates: 58°50′N 40°36′E
- Country: Russia
- Region: Vologda Oblast
- District: Gryazovetsky District
- Time zone: UTC+3:00

Uglentsevo (Russian: Угленцево) is a rural locality (a village) in Pertsevskoye Rural Settlement, Gryazovetsky District, Vologda Oblast, Russia. The population was 28 as of 2002.

== Geography ==
Uglentsevo is located 27 km southeast of Gryazovets (the district's administrative centre) by road. Zhernokovo is the nearest rural locality.
