= Agrafenka =

Agrafenka Аграфенка
- Village
- Location within Vologda Oblast Location within Russia
- Coordinates: 59°03′N 40°16′E
- Country: Russia
- Region: Vologda Oblast
- District: Gryazovetsky District
- Time zone: UTC+3:00

Agrafenka (Russian: Аграфенка) is a rural locality (a village) in Komyanskoye Rural Settlement, Gryazovetsky District, Vologda Oblast, Russia. The population was 4 as of 2002.

== Geography ==
Agrafenka is located 26 km (16 mi) north of Gryazovets (the district's administrative centre) by road. Shepyakovo is the nearest rural locality.
