= Yelnik =

Yelnik Ельник
- Village
- Location within Vologda Oblast Location within Russia
- Coordinates: 58°39′N 40°12′E
- Country: Russia
- Region: Vologda Oblast
- District: Gryazovetsky District
- Time zone: UTC+3:00

Yelnik (Russian: Ельник) is a rural locality (a village) in Rostilovskoye Rural Settlement, Gryazovetsky District, Vologda Oblast, Russia. The population was 2 as of 2002.

== Geography ==
Yelnik is located 36 km south of Gryazovets (the district's administrative centre) by road. Artyomovo is the nearest rural locality.
