= Stanovishchevo =

Stanovishchevo Становищево
- Village
- Location within Vologda Oblast Location within Russia
- Coordinates: 59°01′N 40°11′E
- Country: Russia
- Region: Vologda Oblast
- District: Gryazovetsky District
- Time zone: UTC+3:00

Stanovishchevo (Russian: Становищево) is a rural locality (a village) in Pertsevskoye Rural Settlement, Gryazovetsky District, Vologda Oblast, Russia. The population was 35 as of 2002. There are 4 streets.

== Geography ==
Stanovishchevo is located 17 km north of Gryazovets (the district's administrative centre) by road. Dorozhny Krutets is the nearest rural locality.
