= Suvorkovo =

Suvorkovo Суворково
- Village
- Location within Vologda Oblast Location within Russia
- Coordinates: 58°51′N 40°33′E
- Country: Russia
- Region: Vologda Oblast
- District: Gryazovetsky District
- Time zone: UTC+3:00

Suvorkovo (Russian: Суворково) is a rural locality (a village) in Pertsevskoye Rural Settlement, Gryazovetsky District, Vologda Oblast, Russia. The population was 3 as of 2002.

== Geography ==
Suvorkovo is located 21 km east of Gryazovets (the district's administrative centre) by road. Melenka is the nearest rural locality.
