= Vyborovo =

Vyborovo Выборово
- Village
- Location within Vologda Oblast Location within Russia
- Coordinates: 58°52′N 40°33′E
- Country: Russia
- Region: Vologda Oblast
- District: Gryazovetsky District
- Time zone: UTC+3:00

Vyborovo (Russian: Выборово) is a rural locality (a village) in Pertsevskoye Rural Settlement, Gryazovetsky District, Vologda Oblast, Russia. The population was 9 as of 2002.

== Geography ==
Vyborovo is located 23 km east of Gryazovets (the district's administrative centre) by road. Klimovo is the nearest rural locality.
