= Panovo, Gryazovetsky District, Vologda Oblast =

Panovo Паново
- Village
- Location within Vologda Oblast Location within Russia
- Coordinates: 58°47′32″N 40°48′04″E
- Country: Russia
- Region: Vologda Oblast
- District: Gryazovetsky District
- Time zone: UTC+3:00

Panovo (Russian: Паново) is a rural locality (a village) in Sidorovskoye Rural Settlement, Gryazovetsky District, Vologda Oblast, Russia. The population was 35 as of 2002.

== Geography ==
Panovo is located 38 km southeast of Gryazovets (the district's administrative centre) by road. Anokhino is the nearest rural locality.
