= Voznesenye, Vologda Oblast =

Voznesenye Вознесенье
- Selo
- Location within Vologda Oblast Location within Russia
- Coordinates: 59°00′N 40°23′E
- Country: Russia
- Region: Vologda Oblast
- District: Gryazovetsky District
- Time zone: UTC+3:00

Voznesenye (Russian: Вознесенье) is a rural locality (a selo) in Komyanskoye Rural Settlement, Gryazovetsky District, Vologda Oblast, Russia. The population was 2 as of 2002.

== Geography ==
Voznesenye is located 36 km northeast of Gryazovets (the district's administrative centre) by road. Popovka is the nearest rural locality.
