= Volynevo =

Volynevo Волынево
- Village
- Location within Vologda Oblast Location within Russia
- Coordinates: 58°51′N 40°38′E
- Country: Russia
- Region: Vologda Oblast
- District: Gryazovetsky District
- Time zone: UTC+3:00

Volynevo (Russian: Волынево) is a rural locality (a village) in Pertsevskoye Rural Settlement, Gryazovetsky District, Vologda Oblast, Russia. The population was 4 as of 2002.

== Geography ==
Volynevo is located 26 km east of Gryazovets (the district's administrative centre) by road. Rakovo is the nearest rural locality.
