= Shilmyashevo =

Shilmyashevo Шильмяшево
- Village
- Location within Vologda Oblast Location within Russia
- Coordinates: 58°51′N 40°02′E
- Country: Russia
- Region: Vologda Oblast
- District: Gryazovetsky District
- Time zone: UTC+3:00

Shilmyashevo (Russian: Шильмяшево) is a rural locality (a village) in Yurovskoye Rural Settlement, Gryazovetsky District, Vologda Oblast, Russia. The population was 10 as of 2002.

== Geography ==
Shilmyashevo is located 14 km west of Gryazovets (the district's administrative centre) by road. Skorodumka is the nearest rural locality.
