= Maksimovitsa =

Maksimovitsa Максимовица
- Village
- Location within Vologda Oblast Location within Russia
- Coordinates: 58°54′N 40°46′E
- Country: Russia
- Region: Vologda Oblast
- District: Gryazovetsky District
- Time zone: UTC+3:00

Maksimovitsa (Russian: Максимовица) is a rural locality (a village) in Sidorovskoye Rural Settlement, Gryazovetsky District, Vologda Oblast, Russia. The population was 6 as of 2002.

== Geography ==
Maksimovitsa is located 39 km east of Gryazovets (the district's administrative centre) by road. Lezha is the nearest rural locality.
