= Stary Dor =

Stary Dor Старый Дор
- Village
- Location within Vologda Oblast Location within Russia
- Coordinates: 59°00′N 40°20′E
- Country: Russia
- Region: Vologda Oblast
- District: Gryazovetsky District
- Time zone: UTC+3:00

Stary Dor (Russian: Старый Дор) is a rural locality (a village) in Komyanskoye Rural Settlement, Gryazovetsky District, Vologda Oblast, Russia. The population was 26 as of 2002.

== Geography ==
Stary Dor is located 25 km north of Gryazovets (the district's administrative centre) by road. Podsosenye is the nearest rural locality.
