= Zvyaglovka =

Zvyaglovka Звягловка
- Village
- Location within Vologda Oblast Location within Russia
- Coordinates: 58°59′N 40°11′E
- Country: Russia
- Region: Vologda Oblast
- District: Gryazovetsky District
- Time zone: UTC+3:00

Zvyaglovka (Russian: Звягловка) is a rural locality (a village) in Pertsevskoye Rural Settlement, Gryazovetsky District, Vologda Oblast, Russia. The population was 2 as of 2002.

== Geography ==
Zvyaglovka is located 15 km north of Gryazovets (the district's administrative centre) by road. Chernava is the nearest rural locality.
