= Filippovo, Gryazovetsky District, Vologda Oblast =

Filippovo Филиппово
- Village
- Location within Vologda Oblast Location within Russia
- Coordinates: 58°55′N 39°48′E
- Country: Russia
- Region: Vologda Oblast
- District: Gryazovetsky District
- Time zone: UTC+3:00

Filippovo (Russian: Филиппово) is a rural locality (a village) in Yurovskoye Rural Settlement, Gryazovetsky District, Vologda Oblast, Russia. The population was 8 as of 2002.

== Geography ==
Filippovo is located 36 km (22 mi) northwest of Gryazovets (the district's administrative centre) by road. Fomskoye is the nearest rural locality.
