= Remennikovo =

Remennikovo Ременниково
- Village
- Location within Vologda Oblast Location within Russia
- Coordinates: 58°57′N 39°42′E
- Country: Russia
- Region: Vologda Oblast
- District: Gryazovetsky District
- Time zone: UTC+3:00

Remennikovo (Russian: Ременниково) is a rural locality (a village) in Yurovskoye Rural Settlement, Gryazovetsky District, Vologda Oblast, Russia. The population was 8 as of 2002.

== Geography ==
Remennikovo is located 40 km northwest of Gryazovets (the district's administrative centre) by road. Pichkarevo is the nearest rural locality.
