= Khlyzino =

Khlyzino Хлызино
- Village
- Location within Vologda Oblast Location within Russia
- Coordinates: 58°48′N 40°41′E
- Country: Russia
- Region: Vologda Oblast
- District: Gryazovetsky District
- Time zone: UTC+3:00

Khlyzino (Russian: Хлызино) is a rural locality (a village) in Sidorovskoye Rural Settlement, Gryazovetsky District, Vologda Oblast, Russia. The population was 9 as of 2002.

== Geography ==
Khlyzino is located 34 km (21 mi) southeast of Gryazovets (the district's administrative centre) by road. Sloboda is the nearest rural locality.
