= Krivodino =

Krivodino Криводино
- Village
- Location within Vologda Oblast Location within Russia
- Coordinates: 58°58′N 39°58′E
- Country: Russia
- Region: Vologda Oblast
- District: Gryazovetsky District
- Time zone: UTC+3:00

Krivodino (Russian: Криводино) is a rural locality (a village) in Yurovskoye Rural Settlement, Gryazovetsky District, Vologda Oblast, Russia. The population was 120 as of 2002. There are 6 streets.

== Geography ==
Krivodino is located 45 km (28 mi) northwest of Gryazovets (the district's administrative centre) by road. Yurovo is the nearest rural locality.
