= Obnorskaya Sloboda =

Obnorskaya Sloboda Обнорская Слобода
- Village
- Location within Vologda Oblast Location within Russia
- Coordinates: 58°43′N 40°17′E
- Country: Russia
- Region: Vologda Oblast
- District: Gryazovetsky District
- Time zone: UTC+3:00

Obnorskaya Sloboda (Russian: Обнорская Слобода) is a rural locality (a village) in Rostilovskoye Rural Settlement, Gryazovetsky District, Vologda Oblast, Russia. The population was 27 as of 2002.

== Geography ==
By road, Obnorskaya Sloboda is located 18 km south of Gryazovets (the district's administrative centre). Zayemye is the nearest rural locality.
