= Ragozino, Gryazovetsky District, Vologda Oblast =

Ragozino Рагозино
- Village
- Location within Vologda Oblast Location within Russia
- Coordinates: 58°49′N 40°43′E
- Country: Russia
- Region: Vologda Oblast
- District: Gryazovetsky District
- Time zone: UTC+3:00

Ragozino (Russian: Рагозино) is a rural locality (a village) in Sidorovskoye Rural Settlement, Gryazovetsky District, Vologda Oblast, Russia. The population was 46 as of 2002.

== Geography ==
Ragozino is located 31 km east of Gryazovets (the district's administrative centre) by road. Shushukovo is the nearest rural locality.
