= Shushukovo =

Shushukovo Шушуково
- Village
- Location within Vologda Oblast Location within Russia
- Coordinates: 58°50′N 40°43′E
- Country: Russia
- Region: Vologda Oblast
- District: Gryazovetsky District
- Time zone: UTC+3:00

Shushukovo (Russian: Шушуково) is a rural locality (a village) in Sidorovskoye Rural Settlement, Gryazovetsky District, Vologda Oblast, Russia. The population was 12 as of 2002.

== Geography ==
Shushukovo is located 32 km east of Gryazovets (the district's administrative centre) by road. Ragozino is the nearest rural locality.
