= Mikhalkovo =

Mikhalkovo Михалково
- Village
- Location within Vologda Oblast Location within Russia
- Coordinates: 58°50′N 40°58′E
- Country: Russia
- Region: Vologda Oblast
- District: Gryazovetsky District
- Time zone: UTC+3:00

Mikhalkovo (Russian: Михалково) is a rural locality (a village) in Vokhtozhskoye Rural Settlement, Gryazovetsky District, Vologda Oblast, Russia. The population was 10 as of 2002.

== Geography ==
Mikhalkovo is located 64 km east of Gryazovets (the district's administrative centre) by road. Aksyonovo is the nearest rural locality.
