= Kargino, Vologda Oblast =

Kargino Каргино
- Khutor
- Location within Vologda Oblast Location within Russia
- Coordinates: 58°48′N 41°04′E
- Country: Russia
- Region: Vologda Oblast
- District: Gryazovetsky District
- Time zone: UTC+3:00

Kargino (Russian: Каргино) is a rural locality (a khutor) in Vokhtozhskoye Rural Settlement, Gryazovetsky District, Vologda Oblast, Russia. The population was 82 as of 2002.

== Geography ==
Kargino is located 60 km (37 mi) southeast of Gryazovets (the district's administrative centre) by road. Vokhtoga is the nearest rural locality.
