= Zimnyak =

Zimnyak Зимняк
- Village
- Location within Vologda Oblast Location within Russia
- Coordinates: 59°05′N 40°23′E
- Country: Russia
- Region: Vologda Oblast
- District: Gryazovetsky District
- Time zone: UTC+3:00

Zimnyak (Russian: Зимняк) is a rural locality (a village) in Sidorovskoye Rural Settlement, Gryazovetsky District, Vologda Oblast, Russia. The population was 84 as of 2002. There are 3 streets.

== Geography ==
Zimnyak is located 34 km north of Gryazovets (the district's administrative centre) by road. Gora is the nearest rural locality.
