= Khudynino =

Khudynino Худынино
- Village
- Location within Vologda Oblast Location within Russia
- Coordinates: 58°36′N 40°26′E
- Country: Russia
- Region: Vologda Oblast
- District: Gryazovetsky District
- Time zone: UTC+3:00

Khudynino (Russian: Худынино) is a rural locality (a village) in Rostilovskoye Rural Settlement, Gryazovetsky District, Vologda Oblast, Russia. The population was 4 as of 2002.

== Geography ==
Khudynino is located 36 km (22 mi) south of Gryazovets (the district's administrative centre) by road. Varaksino is the nearest rural locality.
