= Podberezhsky =

Podberezhsky Подбережский
- Passing loop
- Location within Vologda Oblast Location within Russia
- Coordinates: 58°52′N 40°54′E
- Country: Russia
- Region: Vologda Oblast
- District: Gryazovetsky District
- Time zone: UTC+3:00

Podberezhsky (Russian: Подбережский) is a rural locality (a passing loop) in Vokhtozhskoye Rural Settlement, Gryazovetsky District, Vologda Oblast, Russia. The population was four as of 2002.

== Geography ==
Podberezhsky is located 68 km east of Gryazovets (the district's administrative centre) by road. Popovka is the nearest rural locality.
