= Slobodishcha, Gryazovetsky District, Vologda Oblast =

Slobodishcha Слободища
- Village
- Location within Vologda Oblast Location within Russia
- Coordinates: 58°56′N 40°00′E
- Country: Russia
- Region: Vologda Oblast
- District: Gryazovetsky District
- Time zone: UTC+3:00

Slobodishcha (Russian: Слободища) is a rural locality (a village) in Rostilovskoye Rural Settlement, Gryazovetsky District, Vologda Oblast, Russia. The population was 17 as of 2002. There are 2 streets.

== Geography ==
Slobodishcha is located 19 km northwest of Gryazovets (the district's administrative centre) by road. Khaymino is the nearest rural locality.
