= Iyevlevo, Gryazovetsky District, Vologda Oblast =

Iyevlevo Иевлево
- Village
- Location within Vologda Oblast Location within Russia
- Coordinates: 58°36′N 40°25′E
- Country: Russia
- Region: Vologda Oblast
- District: Gryazovetsky District
- Time zone: UTC+3:00

Iyevlevo (Russian: Иевлево) is a rural locality (a village) in Rostilovskoye Rural Settlement, Gryazovetsky District, Vologda Oblast, Russia. The population was 8 as of 2002.

== Geography ==
Iyevlevo is located 35 km (22 mi) south of Gryazovets (the district's administrative centre) by road. Varaksino is the nearest rural locality.
