= Chuvaksino =

Chuvaksino Чуваксино
- Village
- Location within Vologda Oblast Location within Russia
- Coordinates: 58°50′N 40°30′E
- Country: Russia
- Region: Vologda Oblast
- District: Gryazovetsky District
- Time zone: UTC+3:00

Chuvaksino (Russian: Чуваксино) is a rural locality (a village) in Pertsevskoye Rural Settlement, Gryazovetsky District, Vologda Oblast, Russia. The population was 2 as of 2002.

== Geography ==
Chuvaksino is located 17 km (11 mi) southeast of Gryazovets (the district's administrative centre) by road. Rameshki is the nearest rural locality.
