= Dikarevo =

Dikarevo Дикарево
- Village
- Location within Vologda Oblast Location within Russia
- Coordinates: 59°02′N 40°24′E
- Country: Russia
- Region: Vologda Oblast
- District: Gryazovetsky District
- Time zone: UTC+3:00

Dikarevo (Russian: Дикарево) is a rural locality (a village) in Komyanskoye Rural Settlement, Gryazovetsky District, Vologda Oblast, Russia. The population was 15 as of 2002.

== Geography ==
Dikarevo is located 33 km (21 mi) northeast of Gryazovets (the district's administrative centre) by road. Sychevo is the nearest rural locality.
