= Shevyakovo =

Shevyakovo Шевяково
- Village
- Location within Vologda Oblast Location within Russia
- Coordinates: 58°56′N 40°16′E
- Country: Russia
- Region: Vologda Oblast
- District: Gryazovetsky District
- Time zone: UTC+3:00

Shevyakovo (Russian: Шевяково) is a rural locality (a village) in Pertsevskoye Rural Settlement, Gryazovetsky District, Vologda Oblast, Russia. The population was 1 as of 2002.

== Geography ==
Shevyakovo is located 15 km north of Gryazovets (the district's administrative centre) by road. Volkovo is the nearest rural locality.
