= Vokhtoga, Gryazovetsky District, Vologda Oblast =

Vokhtoga Вохтога
- Village
- Location within Vologda Oblast Location within Russia
- Coordinates: 58°45′N 41°04′E
- Country: Russia
- Region: Vologda Oblast
- District: Gryazovetsky District
- Time zone: UTC+3:00

Vokhtoga (Russian: Вохтога) is a rural locality (a village) in Vokhtozhskoye Rural Settlement, Gryazovetsky District, Vologda Oblast, Russia. The population was 21 as of 2002.

== Geography ==
Vokhtoga is located 61 km southeast of Gryazovets (the district's administrative centre) by road. Vaganovo is the nearest rural locality.
