= Akinfovitsa =

Akinfovitsa Акинфовица
- Village
- Location within Vologda Oblast Location within Russia
- Coordinates: 58°58′N 39°59′E
- Country: Russia
- Region: Vologda Oblast
- District: Gryazovetsky District
- Time zone: UTC+3:00

Akinfovitsa (Russian: Акинфовица) is a rural locality (a village) in Yurovskoye Rural Settlement, Gryazovetsky District, Vologda Oblast, Russia. The population was 4 as of 2002.

== Geography ==
Akinfovitsa is located 31 km (19 mi) northwest of Gryazovets (the district's administrative centre) by road. Savkino is the nearest rural locality.
