= Sopelkino =

Sopelkino Сопелкино
- Village
- Location within Vologda Oblast Location within Russia
- Coordinates: 58°42′N 40°18′E
- Country: Russia
- Region: Vologda Oblast
- District: Gryazovetsky District
- Time zone: UTC+3:00

Sopelkino (Russian: Сопелкино) is a rural locality (a village) in Rostilovskoye Rural Settlement, Gryazovetsky District, Vologda Oblast, Russia. The population was 77 as of 2002. There are 2 streets.

== Geography ==
Sopelkino is located 20 km south of Gryazovets (the district's administrative centre) by road. Abanino is the nearest rural locality.
