= Gerasimovo, Gryazovetsky District, Vologda Oblast =

Gerasimovo Герасимово
- Village
- Location within Vologda Oblast Location within Russia
- Coordinates: 58°47′N 40°46′E
- Country: Russia
- Region: Vologda Oblast
- District: Gryazovetsky District
- Time zone: UTC+3:00

Gerasimovo (Russian: Герасимово) is a rural locality (a village) in Sidorovskoye Rural Settlement, Gryazovetsky District, Vologda Oblast, Russia. It had a population of 4 as of 2002.

== Geography ==
Gerasimovo is located 38 km (24 mi) southeast of Gryazovets (the district's administrative centre) by road. Anokhino is the nearest rural locality.
