= Bokotovo =

Bokotovo Бокотово
- Village
- Location within Vologda Oblast Location within Russia
- Coordinates: 58°58′N 39°51′E
- Country: Russia
- Region: Vologda Oblast
- District: Gryazovetsky District
- Time zone: UTC+3:00

Bokotovo (Russian: Бокотово) is a rural locality (a village) in Yurovskoye Rural Settlement, Gryazovetsky District, Vologda Oblast, Russia. The population was 11 as of 2002.

== Geography ==
Bokotovo is located 30 km (19 mi) northwest of Gryazovets (the district's administrative centre) by road. Panfilovo is the nearest rural locality.
