= Kurochkino =

Kurochkino Курочкино
- Village
- Location within Vologda Oblast Location within Russia
- Coordinates: 58°54′N 40°28′E
- Country: Russia
- Region: Vologda Oblast
- District: Gryazovetsky District
- Time zone: UTC+3:00

Kurochkino (Russian: Курочкино) is a rural locality (a village) in Pertsevskoye Rural Settlement, Gryazovetsky District, Vologda Oblast, Russia. The population was 9 as of 2002.

== Geography ==
Kurochkino is located 32 km (20 mi) northeast of Gryazovets (the district's administrative centre) by road. Shemeykino is the nearest rural locality.
