= Podkamenka =

Podkamenka Подкаменка
- Settlement
- Location within Vologda Oblast Location within Russia
- Coordinates: 59°08′N 41°26′E
- Country: Russia
- Region: Vologda Oblast
- District: Gryazovetsky District
- Time zone: UTC+3:00

Podkamenka (Russian: Подкаменка) is a rural locality (a settlement) in Vokhtozhskoye Rural Settlement, Gryazovetsky District, Vologda Oblast, Russia. The population was 41 as of 2002.

== Geography ==
Podkamenka is located 116 km northeast of Gryazovets (the district's administrative centre) by road. Vostrogsky is the nearest rural locality.
