= Serezhino =

Serezhino Сережино
- Village
- Location within Vologda Oblast Location within Russia
- Coordinates: 59°01′N 40°22′E
- Country: Russia
- Region: Vologda Oblast
- District: Gryazovetsky District
- Time zone: UTC+3:00

Serezhino (Russian: Сережино) is a rural locality (a village) in Komyanskoye Rural Settlement, Gryazovetsky District, Vologda Oblast, Russia. The population was 1 as of 2002.

== Geography ==
Serezhino is located 35 km north of Gryazovets (the district's administrative centre) by road. Shchekutyevo is the nearest rural locality.
