= Dyadinskoye =

Dyadinskoye Дядинское
- Village
- Location within Vologda Oblast Location within Russia
- Coordinates: 58°44′N 40°26′E
- Country: Russia
- Region: Vologda Oblast
- District: Gryazovetsky District
- Time zone: UTC+3:00

Dyadinskoye (Russian: Дядинское) is a rural locality (a village) in Rostilovskoye Rural Settlement, Gryazovetsky District, Vologda Oblast, Russia. The population was 5 as of 2002.

== Geography ==
Dyadinskoye is located 26 km (16 mi) southeast of Gryazovets (the district's administrative centre) by road. Timonino is the nearest rural locality.
