= Vislyakovo =

Vislyakovo Висляково
- Village
- Location within Vologda Oblast Location within Russia
- Coordinates: 58°33′N 40°13′E
- Country: Russia
- Region: Vologda Oblast
- District: Gryazovetsky District
- Time zone: UTC+3:00

Vislyakovo (Russian: Висляково) is a rural locality (a village) in Rostilovskoye Rural Settlement, Gryazovetsky District, Vologda Oblast, Russia. The population was 4 as of 2002.

== Geography ==
Vislyakovo is located 54 km south of Gryazovets (the district's administrative centre) by road. Polyanka is the nearest rural locality.
