= Demyankovo =

Demyankovo Демьянково
- Village
- Location within Vologda Oblast Location within Russia
- Coordinates: 58°53′N 40°49′E
- Country: Russia
- Region: Vologda Oblast
- District: Gryazovetsky District
- Time zone: UTC+3:00

Demyankovo (Russian: Демьянково) is a rural locality (a village) in Sidorovskoye Rural Settlement, Gryazovetsky District, Vologda Oblast, Russia. The population was 10 as of 2002.

== Geography ==
Demyankovo is located 44 km (27 mi) east of Gryazovets (the district's administrative centre) by road. Klobukino is the nearest rural locality.
