= Bushuikha (settlement) =

Bushuikha Бушуиха
- Settlement
- Location within Vologda Oblast Location within Russia
- Coordinates: 59°04′N 40°23′E
- Country: Russia
- Region: Vologda Oblast
- District: Gryazovetsky District
- Time zone: UTC+3:00

Bushuikha (Russian: Бушуиха) is a rural locality (a settlement) in Komyanskoye Rural Settlement, Gryazovetsky District, Vologda Oblast, Russia. The population was 437 as of 2002. There are five streets. The timezone is UTC+3:00.

== Geography ==
Bushuikha is located 31 km (19 mi) northeast of Gryazovets (the district's administrative centre) by road. Zarechye is the nearest rural locality.
