= Silifonovo =

Silifonovo Силифоново
- Village
- Location within Vologda Oblast Location within Russia
- Coordinates: 59°01′N 40°18′E
- Country: Russia
- Region: Vologda Oblast
- District: Gryazovetsky District
- Time zone: UTC+3:00

Silifonovo (Russian: Силифоново) is a rural locality (a village) in Komyanskoye Rural Settlement, Gryazovetsky District, Vologda Oblast, Russia. The population was 6 as of 2002.

== Geography ==
Silifonovo is located 28 km north of Gryazovets (the district's administrative centre) by road. Novoye na-Komye is the nearest rural locality.
