= Kalinkino, Gryazovetsky District, Vologda Oblast =

Kalinkino Калинкино
- Village
- Location within Vologda Oblast Location within Russia
- Coordinates: 58°57′N 40°13′E
- Country: Russia
- Region: Vologda Oblast
- District: Gryazovetsky District
- Time zone: UTC+3:00

Kalinkino (Russian: Калинкино) is a rural locality (a village) in Pertsevskoye Rural Settlement, Gryazovetsky District, Vologda Oblast, Russia. The population was 3 as of 2002.

== Geography ==
Kalinkino is located 11 km (6.8 mi) north of Gryazovets (the district's administrative centre) by road. Sloboda is the nearest rural locality.
