= Nikulkino =

Nikulkino Никулкино
- Village
- Location within Vologda Oblast Location within Russia
- Coordinates: 58°44′N 40°58′E
- Country: Russia
- Region: Vologda Oblast
- District: Gryazovetsky District
- Time zone: UTC+3:00

Nikulkino (Russian: Никулкино) is a rural locality (a village) in Sidorovskoye Rural Settlement, Gryazovetsky District, Vologda Oblast, Russia. The population was 10 as of 2002.

== Geography ==
Nikulkino is located 50 km southeast of Gryazovets (the district's administrative centre) by road. Bekrenevo is the nearest rural locality.
