= Minkino, Gryazovetsky District, Vologda Oblast =

Minkino Минькино
- Selo
- Location within Vologda Oblast Location within Russia
- Coordinates: 58°57′N 39°45′E
- Country: Russia
- Region: Vologda Oblast
- District: Gryazovetsky District
- Time zone: UTC+3:00

Minkino (Russian: Минькино) is a rural locality (a selo) in Yurovskoye Rural Settlement, Gryazovetsky District, Vologda Oblast, Russia. The population was 4 as of 2002. There are 5 streets.

== Geography ==
Minkino is located 35 km northwest of Gryazovets (the district's administrative centre) by road. Tarshino is the nearest rural locality.
