= Nazarka =

Nazarka Назарка
- Khutor
- Location within Vologda Oblast Location within Russia
- Coordinates: 58°59′N 39°50′E
- Country: Russia
- Region: Vologda Oblast
- District: Gryazovetsky District
- Time zone: UTC+3:00

Nazarka (Russian: Назарка) is a rural locality (a khutor) in Yurovskoye Rural Settlement, Gryazovetsky District, Vologda Oblast, Russia. The population was 1 as of 2002.

== Geography ==
Nazarka is located 30 km northwest of Gryazovets (the district's administrative centre) by road. Stepkovo is the nearest rural locality.
