= Mishutino =

Mishutino Мишутино
- Village
- Location within Vologda Oblast Location within Russia
- Coordinates: 58°53′N 40°37′E
- Country: Russia
- Region: Vologda Oblast
- District: Gryazovetsky District
- Time zone: UTC+3:00

Mishutino (Russian: Мишутино) is a rural locality (a village) in Pertsevskoye Rural Settlement, Gryazovetsky District, Vologda Oblast, Russia. The population was 26 as of 2002.

== Geography ==
Mishutino is located 30 km east of Gryazovets (the district's administrative centre) by road. Dyrovatovo is the nearest rural locality.
