= Rodionovo, Gryazovetsky District, Vologda Oblast =

Rodionovo Родионово
- Village
- Location within Vologda Oblast Location within Russia
- Coordinates: 58°51′N 40°55′E
- Country: Russia
- Region: Vologda Oblast
- District: Gryazovetsky District
- Time zone: UTC+3:00

Rodionovo (Russian: Родионово) is a rural locality (a village) in Vokhtozhskoye Rural Settlement, Gryazovetsky District, Vologda Oblast, Russia. The population was 10 as of 2002.

== Geography ==
Rodionovo is located 69 km east of Gryazovets (the district's administrative centre) by road. Nikolskoye is the nearest rural locality.
