= Zayemye =

Zayemye Заемье
- Village
- Location within Vologda Oblast Location within Russia
- Coordinates: 58°44′N 40°17′E
- Country: Russia
- Region: Vologda Oblast
- District: Gryazovetsky District
- Time zone: UTC+3:00

Zayemye (Russian: Заемье) is a rural locality (a village) in Rostilovskoye Rural Settlement, Gryazovetsky District, Vologda Oblast, Russia. The population was 143 as of 2002.

== Geography ==
Zayemye is located 16 km south of Gryazovets (the district's administrative centre) by road. Obnorskaya Sloboda is the nearest rural locality.
