= Kolotilikha =

Kolotilikha Колотилиха
- Village
- Location within Vologda Oblast Location within Russia
- Coordinates: 58°52′N 40°50′E
- Country: Russia
- Region: Vologda Oblast
- District: Gryazovetsky District
- Time zone: UTC+3:00

Kolotilikha (Russian: Колотилиха) is a rural locality (a village) in Sidorovskoye Rural Settlement, Gryazovetsky District, Vologda Oblast, Russia. The population was 26 as of 2002.

== Geography ==
Kolotilikha is located 46 km (29 mi) east of Gryazovets (the district's administrative centre) by road. Mukhino is the nearest rural locality.
