= Dresvishche =

Dresvishche Дресвище
- Village
- Location within Vologda Oblast Location within Russia
- Coordinates: 58°47′N 41°04′E
- Country: Russia
- Region: Vologda Oblast
- District: Gryazovetsky District
- Time zone: UTC+3:00

Dresvishche (Russian: Дресвище) is a rural locality (a village) in Vokhtozhskoye Rural Settlement, Gryazovetsky District, Vologda Oblast, Russia. The population was 102 as of 2002.

== Geography ==
Dresvishche is located 59 km (37 mi) southeast of Gryazovets (the district's administrative centre) by road. Tarasovo is the nearest rural locality.
