= Andrakovo, Gryazovetsky District, Vologda Oblast =

Andrakovo Андраково
- Village
- Location within Vologda Oblast Location within Russia
- Coordinates: 59°00′N 39°55′E
- Country: Russia
- Region: Vologda Oblast
- District: Gryazovetsky District
- Time zone: UTC+3:00

Andrakovo (Russian: Андраково) is a rural locality (a village) in Sidorovskoye Rural Settlement, Gryazovetsky District, Vologda Oblast, Russia. The population was 21 as of 2002.

== Geography ==
Andrakovo is located 29 km (18 mi) northwest of Gryazovets (the district's administrative centre) by road. Moshennikovo is the nearest rural locality.
