= Tretnikovo =

Tretnikovo Третниково
- Village
- Location within Vologda Oblast Location within Russia
- Coordinates: 58°36′N 40°10′E
- Country: Russia
- Region: Vologda Oblast
- District: Gryazovetsky District
- Time zone: UTC+3:00

Tretnikovo (Russian: Третниково) is a rural locality (a village) in Rostilovskoye Rural Settlement, Gryazovetsky District, Vologda Oblast, Russia. The population was 1 as of 2002.

== Geography ==
Tretnikovo is located 39 km south of Gryazovets (the district's administrative centre) by road. Nefedovo is the nearest rural locality.
