= Nadorozhny Lipovik =

Nadorozhny Lipovik Надорожный Липовик
- Village
- Location within Vologda Oblast Location within Russia
- Coordinates: 59°06′N 40°25′E
- Country: Russia
- Region: Vologda Oblast
- District: Gryazovetsky District
- Time zone: UTC+3:00

Nadorozhny Lipovik (Russian: Надорожный Липовик) is a rural locality (a village) in Komyanskoye Rural Settlement, Gryazovetsky District, Vologda Oblast, Russia. The population was 16 as of 2002.

== Geography ==
Nadorozhny Lipovik is located 36 km northeast of Gryazovets (the district's administrative centre) by road. Kashino is the nearest rural locality.
