= Barskoye-Syrishchevo =

Barskoye-Syrishchevo Барское-Сырищево
- Village
- Location within Vologda Oblast Location within Russia
- Coordinates: 59°07′N 40°28′E
- Country: Russia
- Region: Vologda Oblast
- District: Gryazovetsky District
- Time zone: UTC+3:00

Barskoye-Syrishchevo (Russian: Барское-Сырищево) is a rural locality (a village) in Komyanskoye Rural Settlement, Gryazovetsky District, Vologda Oblast, Russia. The population was 6 as of 2002.

== Geography ==
Barskoye-Syrishchevo is located 39 km (24 mi) northeast of Gryazovets (the district's administrative centre) by road. Volnoye-Syrishchevo is the nearest locality. lake Maurinskoye nearest lake with 4 village Maurino and mount Maura in region connecting with a line form a bracket
