= Senga, Vologda Oblast =

Senga Сеньга
- Selo
- Location within Vologda Oblast Location within Russia
- Coordinates: 58°53′N 40°44′E
- Country: Russia
- Region: Vologda Oblast
- District: Gryazovetsky District
- Time zone: UTC+3:00

Senga (Russian: Сеньга) is a rural locality (a selo) in Sidorovskoye Rural Settlement, Gryazovetsky District, Vologda Oblast, Russia. The population was 74 as of 2002.

== Geography ==
Senga is located 34 km east of Gryazovets (the district's administrative centre) by road. Lukyanovo is the nearest rural locality.
