= Bolshoye Denisyevo =

Bolshoye Denisyevo Большое Денисьево
- Village
- Location within Vologda Oblast Location within Russia
- Coordinates: 59°02′N 40°18′E
- Country: Russia
- Region: Vologda Oblast
- District: Gryazovetsky District
- Time zone: UTC+3:00

Bolshoye Denisyevo (Russian: Большое Денисьево) is a rural locality (a village) in Komyanskoye Rural Settlement, Gryazovetsky District, Vologda Oblast, Russia. The population was 3 as of 2002.

== Geography ==
Bolshoye Denisyevo is by road 24 km (15 mi) north of Gryazovets (the district's administrative centre). Maloye Denisyevo is the nearest rural locality.
