= Arsenka =

Arsenka Арсенка
- Village
- Location within Vologda Oblast Location within Russia
- Coordinates: 58°53′N 40°33′E
- Country: Russia
- Region: Vologda Oblast
- District: Gryazovetsky District
- Time zone: UTC+3:00

Arsenka (Russian: Арсенка) is a rural locality (a village) in Pertsevskoye Rural Settlement, Gryazovetsky District, Vologda Oblast, Russia. The population was 7 as of 2002.

== Geography ==
Arsenka is located 24 km (15 mi) east of Gryazovets (the district's administrative centre) by road. Vyborovo is the nearest rural locality.
