= Peredkovo =

Peredkovo Передково
- Village
- Location within Vologda Oblast Location within Russia
- Coordinates: 58°56′N 40°20′E
- Country: Russia
- Region: Vologda Oblast
- District: Gryazovetsky District
- Time zone: UTC+3:00

Peredkovo (Russian: Передково) is a rural locality (a village) in Pertsevskoye Rural Settlement, Gryazovetsky District, Vologda Oblast, Russia. The population was 3 as of 2002.

== Geography ==
Peredkovo is located 19 km northeast of Gryazovets (the district's administrative centre) by road. Rudino is the nearest rural locality.
