= Ileykino, Gryazovetsky District, Vologda Oblast =

Ileykino Илейкино
- Village
- Location within Vologda Oblast Location within Russia
- Coordinates: 59°02′N 40°11′E
- Country: Russia
- Region: Vologda Oblast
- District: Gryazovetsky District
- Time zone: UTC+3:00

Ileykino (Russian: Илейкино) is a rural locality (a village) in Pertsevskoye Rural Settlement, Gryazovetsky District, Vologda Oblast, Russia. The population was 6 as of 2002.

== Geography ==
Ileykino is located 19 km (12 mi) north of Gryazovets (the district's administrative centre) by road. Ulyanovka is the nearest rural locality.
