= Shemeykino =

Shemeykino Шемейкино
- Village
- Location within Vologda Oblast Location within Russia
- Coordinates: 58°54′N 40°26′E
- Country: Russia
- Region: Vologda Oblast
- District: Gryazovetsky District
- Time zone: UTC+3:00

Shemeykino (Russian: Шемейкино) is a rural locality (a village) in Pertsevskoye Rural Settlement, Gryazovetsky District, Vologda Oblast, Russia. The population was 16 as of 2002.

== Geography ==
Shemeykino is located 32 km northeast of Gryazovets (the district's administrative centre) by road. Pochinok is the nearest rural locality.
