= Novy Dor =

Novy Dor Новый Дор
- Village
- Location within Vologda Oblast Location within Russia
- Coordinates: 59°00′N 40°22′E
- Country: Russia
- Region: Vologda Oblast
- District: Gryazovetsky District
- Time zone: UTC+3:00

Novy Dor (Russian: Новый Дор) is a rural locality (a village) in Komyanskoye Rural Settlement, Gryazovetsky District, Vologda Oblast, Russia. The population was 6 as of 2002.

== Geography ==
Novy Dor is located 26 km northeast of Gryazovets (the district's administrative centre) by road. Stary Dor is the nearest rural locality.
