= Chernogubovo =

Chernogubovo Черногубово
- Village
- Location within Vologda Oblast Location within Russia
- Coordinates: 59°01′N 40°12′E
- Country: Russia
- Region: Vologda Oblast
- District: Gryazovetsky District
- Time zone: UTC+3:00

Chernogubovo (Russian: Черногубово) is a rural locality (a village) in Pertsevskoye Rural Settlement, Gryazovetsky District, Vologda Oblast, Russia. The population was 2 as of 2002.

== Geography ==
Chernogubovo is 21 kilometres (13 mi) north of Gryazovets (the district's administrative centre) by road. Demkino is the nearest rural locality.
