= Dolotovo =

Dolotovo Долотово
- Village
- Location within Vologda Oblast Location within Russia
- Coordinates: 59°00′N 40°05′E
- Country: Russia
- Region: Vologda Oblast
- District: Gryazovetsky District
- Time zone: UTC+3:00

Dolotovo (Russian: Долотово) is a rural locality (a village) in Pertsevskoye Rural Settlement, Gryazovetsky District, Vologda Oblast, Russia. The population was 2 as of 2002. There are 2 streets.

== Geography ==
Dolotovo is located 24 km (15 mi) northwest of Gryazovets (the district's administrative centre) by road. Sannikovo is the nearest rural locality.
