= Nikultsevo =

Nikultsevo Никульцево
- Village
- Location within Vologda Oblast Location within Russia
- Coordinates: 59°01′N 40°07′E
- Country: Russia
- Region: Vologda Oblast
- District: Gryazovetsky District
- Time zone: UTC+3:00

Nikultsevo (Russian: Никульцево) is a rural locality (a village) in Pertsevskoye Rural Settlement, Gryazovetsky District, Vologda Oblast, Russia. The population was 4 as of 2002.

== Geography ==
Nikultsevo is located 23 km northwest of Gryazovets (the district's administrative centre) by road. Medvedevo is the nearest rural locality.
