= Chernava, Vologda Oblast =

Chernava Чернава
- Village
- Location within Vologda Oblast Location within Russia
- Coordinates: 58°59′N 40°11′E
- Country: Russia
- Region: Vologda Oblast
- District: Gryazovetsky District
- Time zone: UTC+3:00

Chernava (Russian: Чернава) is a rural locality (a village) in Pertsevskoye Rural Settlement, Gryazovetsky District, Vologda Oblast, Russia. The population was 15 as of 2002.

== Geography ==
Chernava is located 15 km (9.3 mi) north of Gryazovets (the district's administrative centre) by road. Zvyaglovka is the nearest rural locality.
