= Dyukosovo =

Dyukosovo Дюкосово
- Village
- Location within Vologda Oblast Location within Russia
- Coordinates: 58°55′N 40°13′E
- Country: Russia
- Region: Vologda Oblast
- District: Gryazovetsky District
- Time zone: UTC+3:00

Dyukosovo (Russian: Дюкосово) is a rural locality (a village) in Pertsevskoye Rural Settlement, Gryazovetsky District, Vologda Oblast, Russia. The population was 11 as of 2002.

== Geography ==
Dyukosovo is located 6 km (3.7 mi) north of Gryazovets (the district's administrative centre) by road. Kameshnik is the nearest rural locality.
