= Devyat Izb =

9 Izb Девять Изб
- Village
- Location within Vologda Oblast Location within Russia
- Coordinates: 58°56′N 40°12′E
- Country: Russia
- Region: Vologda Oblast
- District: Gryazovetsky District
- Time zone: UTC+3:00

Devyat Izb (Russian: Девять Изб; lit. "nine wooden houses") is a rural locality (a village) in Pertsevskoye Rural Settlement, Gryazovetsky District, Vologda Oblast, Russia. The population was 5 as of 2002.

== Geography ==
Devyat Izb is located 12 km (7.5 mi) north of Gryazovets (the district's administrative centre) by road. Yakovlevka is the nearest locality.
