= Chernitsyno =

Chernitsyno Черницыно
- Village
- Location within Vologda Oblast Location within Russia
- Coordinates: 58°53′N 40°19′E
- Country: Russia
- Region: Vologda Oblast
- District: Gryazovetsky District
- Time zone: UTC+3:00

Chernitsyno (Russian: Черницыно) is a rural locality (a village) in Pertsevskoye Rural Settlement, Gryazovetsky District, Vologda Oblast, Russia. The population was 3 as of 2002.

== Geography ==
Chernitsyno is located 7 km (4.3 mi) northeast of Gryazovets (the district's administrative centre) by road. Gryazovets is the nearest rural locality.
