= Bolshoye Brodino =

Bolshoye Brodino Большое Бродино
- Village
- Location within Vologda Oblast Location within Russia
- Coordinates: 58°52′N 40°42′E
- Country: Russia
- Region: Vologda Oblast
- District: Gryazovetsky District
- Time zone: UTC+3:00

Bolshoye Brodino (Russian: Большое Бродино) is a rural locality (a village) in Sidorovskoye Rural Settlement, Gryazovetsky District, Vologda Oblast, Russia. The population was 9 as of 2002.

== Geography ==
Bolshoye Brodino is located 30 km (19 mi) east of Gryazovets (the district's administrative centre) by road. Levino is the nearest rural locality.
