= Loginovo, Gryazovetsky District, Vologda Oblast =

Loginovo Логиново
- Village
- Location within Vologda Oblast Location within Russia
- Coordinates: 59°01′24″N 40°18′28″E
- Country: Russia
- Region: Vologda Oblast
- District: Gryazovetsky District
- Time zone: UTC+3:00

Loginovo (Russian: Логиново) is a rural locality (a village) in Komyanskoye Rural Settlement, Gryazovetsky District, Vologda Oblast, Russia. The population was 11 as of 2002.

== Geography ==
Loginovo is located 22 km (14 mi) north of Gryazovets (the district's administrative centre) by road. Novoye-na-Komye is the nearest rural locality.
