= Lomok =

Lomok Ломок
- Village
- Location within Vologda Oblast Location within Russia
- Coordinates: 59°00′N 39°57′E
- Country: Russia
- Region: Vologda Oblast
- District: Gryazovetsky District
- Time zone: UTC+3:00

Lomok (Russian: Ломок) is a rural locality (a village) in Yurovskoye Rural Settlement, Gryazovetsky District, Vologda Oblast, Russia. The population was 2 as of 2002.

== Geography ==
Lomok is located 38 km (24 mi) northwest of Gryazovets (the district's administrative centre) by road. Novoselka is the nearest rural locality.
