= Vasyukovo, Gryazovetsky District, Vologda Oblast =

Vasyukovo Васюково
- Village
- Location within Vologda Oblast Location within Russia
- Coordinates: 58°50′N 39°57′E
- Country: Russia
- Region: Vologda Oblast
- District: Gryazovetsky District
- Time zone: UTC+3:00

Vasyukovo (Russian: Васюково) is a rural locality (a village) in Yurovskoye Rural Settlement, Gryazovetsky District, Vologda Oblast, Russia. The population was 41 as of 2002.

== Geography ==
Vasyukovo is located 21 km southwest of Gryazovets (the district's administrative centre) by road. Prokopyevo is the nearest rural locality.
