= Kiselevo, Gryazovetsky District, Vologda Oblast =

Kiselevo Киселево
- Village
- Location within Vologda Oblast Location within Russia
- Coordinates: 59°04′N 40°34′E
- Country: Russia
- Region: Vologda Oblast
- District: Gryazovetsky District
- Time zone: UTC+3:00

Kiselevo (Russian: Киселево) is a rural locality (a village) in Komyanskoye Rural Settlement, Gryazovetsky District, Vologda Oblast, Russia. The population was 16 as of 2002.

== Geography ==
Kiselevo is located 46 km (29 mi) northeast of Gryazovets (the district's administrative centre) by road. Velikoretsky Lipovik is the nearest rural locality.
