= Verkhnyaya Pustyn =

Verkhnyaya Pustyn Верхняя Пустынь
- Village
- Location within Vologda Oblast Location within Russia
- Coordinates: 58°48′N 40°57′E
- Country: Russia
- Region: Vologda Oblast
- District: Gryazovetsky District
- Time zone: UTC+3:00

Verkhnyaya Pustyn (Russian: Верхняя Пустынь) is a rural locality (a village) in Vokhtozhskoye Rural Settlement, Gryazovetsky District, Vologda Oblast, Russia. The population was 2 as of 2002.

== Geography ==
Verkhnyaya Pustyn is located 66 km southeast of Gryazovets (the district's administrative centre) by road. Afanaskovo is the nearest rural locality.
