= Chuprovo, Gryazovetsky District, Vologda Oblast =

Chuprovo Чупрово
- Village
- Location within Vologda Oblast Location within Russia
- Coordinates: 58°37′N 40°21′E
- Country: Russia
- Region: Vologda Oblast
- District: Gryazovetsky District
- Time zone: UTC+3:00

Chuprovo (Russian: Чупрово) is a rural locality (a village) in Rostilovskoye Rural Settlement, Gryazovetsky District, Vologda Oblast, Russia. The population was 2 as of 2002.

== Geography ==
Chuprovo is located 31 km (19 mi) south of Gryazovets (the district's administrative centre) by road. Anosovo is the nearest rural locality.
