= Stroyevo =

Stroyevo Строево
- Village
- Location within Vologda Oblast Location within Russia
- Coordinates: 58°49′N 40°59′E
- Country: Russia
- Region: Vologda Oblast
- District: Gryazovetsky District
- Time zone: UTC+3:00

Stroyevo (Russian: Строево) is a rural locality (a village) in Vokhtozhskoye Rural Settlement, Gryazovetsky District, Vologda Oblast, Russia. The population was 27 as of 2002.

== Geography ==
Stroyevo is located 61 km southeast of Gryazovets (the district's administrative centre) by road. Chukharitsa is the nearest rural locality.
