= Novoye-na-Lukhte =

Novoye-na-Lukhte Новое-на-Лухте
- Village
- Location within Vologda Oblast Location within Russia
- Coordinates: 59°02′N 40°15′E
- Country: Russia
- Region: Vologda Oblast
- District: Gryazovetsky District
- Time zone: UTC+3:00

Novoye-na-Lukhte (Russian: Новое-на-Лухте) is a rural locality (a village) in Komyanskoye Rural Settlement, Gryazovetsky District, Vologda Oblast, Russia. The population was 2 as of 2002.

== Geography ==
Novoye-na-Lukhte is located 24 km north of Gryazovets (the district's administrative centre) by road. Vasilevo is the nearest rural locality.
