= Stepkovo, Vologda Oblast =

Stepkovo Степково
- Village
- Location within Vologda Oblast Location within Russia
- Coordinates: 58°59′N 39°50′E
- Country: Russia
- Region: Vologda Oblast
- District: Gryazovetsky District
- Time zone: UTC+3:00

Stepkovo (Russian: Степково) is a rural locality (a village) in Yurovskoye Rural Settlement, Gryazovetsky District, Vologda Oblast, Russia. The population was 19 as of 2002.

== Geography ==
Stepkovo is located 30 km northwest of Gryazovets (the district's administrative centre) by road. Nazarka is the nearest rural locality.
