= Bel, Vologda Oblast =

Bel Бель
- Village
- Location within Vologda Oblast Location within Russia
- Coordinates: 59°07′N 40°26′E
- Country: Russia
- Region: Vologda Oblast
- District: Gryazovetsky District
- Time zone: UTC+3:00

Bel (Russian: Бель) is a rural locality (a village) in Komyanskoye Rural Settlement, Gryazovetsky District, Vologda Oblast, Russia. The population was 5 as of 2002.

== Geography ==
Bel is located 36 km (22 mi) northeast of Gryazovets (the district's administrative centre) by road. Kashino is the nearest rural locality.
