= Lukyanovo, Gryazovetsky District, Vologda Oblast =

Lukyanovo Лукьяново
- Village
- Location within Vologda Oblast Location within Russia
- Coordinates: 58°53′N 40°45′E
- Country: Russia
- Region: Vologda Oblast
- District: Gryazovetsky District
- Time zone: UTC+3:00

Lukyanovo (Russian: Лукьяново) is a rural locality (a village) in Sidorovskoye Rural Settlement, Gryazovetsky District, Vologda Oblast, Russia. The population was 15 as of 2002.

== Geography ==
Lukyanovo is located 34 km (21 mi) east of Gryazovets (the district's administrative centre) by road. Senga is the nearest rural locality.
