= Shirakovo =

Shirakovo Шираково
- Village
- Location within Vologda Oblast Location within Russia
- Coordinates: 58°52′N 40°02′E
- Country: Russia
- Region: Vologda Oblast
- District: Gryazovetsky District
- Time zone: UTC+3:00

Shirakovo (Russian: Шираково) is a rural locality (a village) in Yurovskoye Rural Settlement, Gryazovetsky District, Vologda Oblast, Russia. The population was five as of 2002.

== Geography ==
Shirakovo is located 17 km west of Gryazovets (the district's administrative centre) by road. Chernetskoye is the nearest rural locality.
