= Vosya (settlement) =

Vosya Восья
- Settlement
- Location within Vologda Oblast Location within Russia
- Coordinates: 59°00′N 41°11′E
- Country: Russia
- Region: Vologda Oblast
- District: Gryazovetsky District
- Time zone: UTC+3:00

Vosya (Russian: Восья) is a rural locality (a settlement) in Vokhtozhskoye Rural Settlement, Gryazovetsky District, Vologda Oblast, Russia. The population was 7 inhabitants as of 2002.

== Geography ==
It is located 92 km northeast of Gryazovets, the district's administrative centre, by road. Vosya (the village) is the nearest rural locality.
