= Posyolok Lnozavoda, Vologda Oblast =

Posyolok Lnozavoda Посёлок Льнозавода
- Settlement
- Location within Vologda Oblast Location within Russia
- Coordinates: 58°49′N 40°15′E
- Country: Russia
- Region: Vologda Oblast
- District: Gryazovetsky District
- Time zone: UTC+3:00

Posyolok Lnozavoda (Russian: Посёлок Льнозавода) is a rural locality (a settlement) in Rostilovskoye Rural Settlement, Gryazovetsky District, Vologda Oblast, Russia. The population was 370 as of 2002. There are 3 streets.

== Geography ==
The settlement is located 5 km south of Gryazovets (the district's administrative centre) by road. Kornilyevo is the nearest rural locality.
