= Popovkino, Gryazovetsky District, Vologda Oblast =

Popovkino Поповкино
- Village
- Location within Vologda Oblast Location within Russia
- Coordinates: 58°40′N 40°22′E
- Country: Russia
- Region: Vologda Oblast
- District: Gryazovetsky District
- Time zone: UTC+3:00

Popovkino (Russian: Поповкино) is a rural locality (a village) in Rostilovskoye Rural Settlement, Gryazovetsky District, Vologda Oblast, Russia. The population was 1 as of 2002.

== Geography ==
Popovkino is located 27 km south of Gryazovets (the district's administrative centre) by road. Shabanovo is the nearest rural locality.
