= Oberikha =

Oberikha Обериха
- Village
- Location within Vologda Oblast Location within Russia
- Coordinates: 59°03′N 40°23′E
- Country: Russia
- Region: Vologda Oblast
- District: Gryazovetsky District
- Time zone: UTC+3:00

Oberikha (Russian: Обериха) is a rural locality (a village) in Komyanskoye Rural Settlement, Gryazovetsky District, Vologda Oblast, Russia. The population was 2 as of 2002.

== Geography ==
Oberikha is located 33 km northeast of Gryazovets (the district's administrative centre) by road. Nizovka is the nearest rural locality.
