= Kelyino =

Kelyino Кельино
- Village
- Location within Vologda Oblast Location within Russia
- Coordinates: 58°47′N 40°52′E
- Country: Russia
- Region: Vologda Oblast
- District: Gryazovetsky District
- Time zone: UTC+3:00

Kelyino (Russian: Кельино) is a rural locality (a village) in Sidorovskoye Rural Settlement, Gryazovetsky District, Vologda Oblast, Russia. The population was 7 as of 2002.

== Geography ==
Kelyino is located 45 km (28 mi) southeast of Gryazovets (the district's administrative centre) by road. Levino is the nearest rural locality.
