= Puzovo =

Puzovo Пузово
- Village
- Location within Vologda Oblast Location within Russia
- Coordinates: 58°58′N 40°12′E
- Country: Russia
- Region: Vologda Oblast
- District: Gryazovetsky District
- Time zone: UTC+3:00

Puzovo (Russian: Пузово) is a rural locality (a village) in Pertsevskoye Rural Settlement, Gryazovetsky District, Vologda Oblast, Russia. The population was 7 as of 2002.

== Geography ==
Puzovo is located 13 km north of Gryazovets (the district's administrative centre) by road. Gridino is the nearest rural locality.
