= Bolshoye Zaymishche =

Bolshoye Zaymishche Большое Займище
- Village
- Location within Vologda Oblast Location within Russia
- Coordinates: 58°55′N 40°30′E
- Country: Russia
- Region: Vologda Oblast
- District: Gryazovetsky District
- Time zone: UTC+3:00

Bolshoye Zaymishche (Russian: Большое Займище) is a rural locality (a village) in Pertsevskoye Rural Settlement, Gryazovetsky District, Vologda Oblast, Russia. The population was 30 as of 2002.

== Geography ==
Bolshoye Zaymishche is located 30 km (19 mi) northeast of Gryazovets (the district's administrative centre) by road. Yezhovo is the nearest rural locality.
