= Lyabzunka =

Lyabzunka Лябзунка
- Village
- Location within Vologda Oblast Location within Russia
- Coordinates: 58°48′N 40°45′E
- Country: Russia
- Region: Vologda Oblast
- District: Gryazovetsky District
- Time zone: UTC+3:00

Lyabzunka (Russian: Лябзунка) is a rural locality (a village) in Sidorovskoye Rural Settlement, Gryazovetsky District, Vologda Oblast, Russia. The population was 6 as of 2002.

== Geography ==
Lyabzunka is located 35 km (22 mi) southeast of Gryazovets (the district's administrative centre) by road. Anokhino is the nearest rural locality.
