= Anankino =

Anankino Ананкино
- Village
- Location within Vologda Oblast Location within Russia
- Coordinates: 59°00′N 40°16′E
- Country: Russia
- Region: Vologda Oblast
- District: Gryazovetsky District
- Time zone: UTC+3:00

Anankino (Russian: Ананкино) is a rural locality (a village) in Komyanskoye Rural Settlement, Gryazovetsky District, Vologda Oblast, Russia. The population was 2 as of 2002.

== Geography ==
Anankino is located 19 km (12 mi) north of Gryazovets (the district's administrative centre) by road. Prokunino is the nearest rural locality.
