= Chistopyanovo =

Chistopyanovo Чистопьяново
- Village
- Location within Vologda Oblast Location within Russia
- Coordinates: 58°32′N 40°30′E
- Country: Russia
- Region: Vologda Oblast
- District: Gryazovetsky District
- Time zone: UTC+3:00

Chistopyanovo (Russian: Чистопьяново) is a rural locality (a village) in Rostilovskoye Rural Settlement, Gryazovetsky District, Vologda Oblast, Russia. The population was 2 as of 2002.

== Geography ==
Chistopyanovo is located 45 km (28 mi) southeast of Gryazovets (the district's administrative centre) by road. Arkatovo is the nearest rural locality.
