= Yesyutkino =

Yesyutkino Есюткино
- Village
- Location within Vologda Oblast Location within Russia
- Coordinates: 59°00′N 39°54′E
- Country: Russia
- Region: Vologda Oblast
- District: Gryazovetsky District
- Time zone: UTC+3:00

Yesyutkino (Russian: Есюткино) is a rural locality (a village) in Yurovskoye Rural Settlement, Gryazovetsky District, Vologda Oblast, Russia. The population was 9 as of 2002.

== Geography ==
Yesyutkino is located 29 km northwest of Gryazovets (the district's administrative centre) by road. Korotygino is the nearest rural locality.
