= Nekhotovo =

Nekhotovo Нехотово
- Village
- Location within Vologda Oblast Location within Russia
- Coordinates: 59°06′N 40°29′E
- Country: Russia
- Region: Vologda Oblast
- District: Gryazovetsky District
- Time zone: UTC+3:00

Nekhotovo (Russian: Нехотово) is a rural locality (a village) in Komyanskoye Rural Settlement, Gryazovetsky District, Vologda Oblast, Russia. The population was 3 as of 2002.

== Geography ==
Nekhotovo is located 40 km northeast of Gryazovets (the district's administrative centre) by road. Volnoye-Syrishchevo is the nearest rural locality.
