= Blazny =

Blazny Блазны
- Village
- Location within Vologda Oblast Location within Russia
- Coordinates: 58°57′N 40°33′E
- Country: Russia
- Region: Vologda Oblast
- District: Gryazovetsky District
- Time zone: UTC+3:00

Blazny (Russian: Блазны) is a rural locality (a village) in Pertsevskoye Rural Settlement, Gryazovetsky District, Vologda Oblast, Russia. The population was 18 as of 2002.

== Geography ==
Blazny is located 36 km (22 mi) northeast of Gryazovets (the district's administrative centre) by road. Koshkino is the nearest rural locality.
