= Poltinino =

Poltinino Полтинино
- Village
- Location within Vologda Oblast Location within Russia
- Coordinates: 59°00′N 40°09′E
- Country: Russia
- Region: Vologda Oblast
- District: Gryazovetsky District
- Time zone: UTC+3:00

Poltinino (Russian: Полтинино) is a rural locality (a village) in Pertsevskoye Rural Settlement, Gryazovetsky District, Vologda Oblast, Russia. The population was 12 as of 2002.

== Geography ==
Poltinino is located 18 km north of Gryazovets (the district's administrative centre) by road. Lupochino is the nearest rural locality.
