= Bakshino =

Bakshino Бакшино
- Village
- Location within Vologda Oblast Location within Russia
- Coordinates: 58°45′N 40°57′E
- Country: Russia
- Region: Vologda Oblast
- District: Gryazovetsky District
- Time zone: UTC+3:00

Bakshino (Russian: Бакшино) is a rural locality (a village) in Sidorovskoye Rural Settlement, Gryazovetsky District, Vologda Oblast, Russia. The population was 17 as of 2002.

== Geography ==
Bakshino is located 49 km (30 mi) southeast of Gryazovets (the district's administrative centre) by road. Bekrenevo is the nearest rural locality.
