= Bolshiye Dvorishcha =

Bolshiye Dvorishcha Большие Дворища
- Village
- Location within Vologda Oblast Location within Russia
- Coordinates: 58°50′N 40°27′E
- Country: Russia
- Region: Vologda Oblast
- District: Gryazovetsky District
- Time zone: UTC+3:00

Bolshiye Dvorishcha (Russian: Большие Дворища) is a rural locality (a village) in Pertsevskoye Rural Settlement, Gryazovetsky District, Vologda Oblast, Russia. The population was 81 as of 2002.

== Geography ==
Bolshiye Dvorishcha is located 14 km (8.7 mi) southeast of Gryazovets (the district's administrative centre) by road. Rameshki is the nearest rural locality.
