= Plyushchevo =

Plyushchevo Плющево
- Village
- Location within Vologda Oblast Location within Russia
- Coordinates: 58°46′N 40°01′E
- Country: Russia
- Region: Vologda Oblast
- District: Gryazovetsky District
- Time zone: UTC+3:00

Plyushchevo (Russian: Плющево) is a rural locality (a village) in Yurovskoye Rural Settlement, Gryazovetsky District, Vologda Oblast, Russia. The population was 11 as of 2002.

== Geography ==
Plyushchevo is located 32 km southwest of Gryazovets (the district's administrative centre) by road. Kuzemkino is the nearest rural locality.
