= Vysokovo, Gryazovetsky District, Vologda Oblast =

Vysokovo Высоково
- Village
- Location within Vologda Oblast Location within Russia
- Coordinates: 58°41′N 40°25′E
- Country: Russia
- Region: Vologda Oblast
- District: Gryazovetsky District
- Time zone: UTC+3:00

Vysokovo (Russian: Высоково) is a rural locality (a village) in Rostilovskoye Rural Settlement, Gryazovetsky District, Vologda Oblast, Russia. The population was 2 as of 2002.

== Geography ==
Vysokovo is located 28 km south of Gryazovets (the district's administrative centre) by road. Pochatkovo is the nearest rural locality.
