= Korbino =

Korbino Корбино
- Village
- Location within Vologda Oblast Location within Russia
- Coordinates: 58°53′N 40°08′E
- Country: Russia
- Region: Vologda Oblast
- District: Gryazovetsky District
- Time zone: UTC+3:00

Korbino (Russian: Корбино) is a rural locality (a village) in Pertsevskoye Rural Settlement, Gryazovetsky District, Vologda Oblast, Russia. The population was 5 as of 2002.

== Geography ==
Korbino is located 8 km (5.0 mi) northwest of Gryazovets (the district's administrative centre) by road. Kachalovo is the nearest rural locality.
