= Ivonino, Gryazovetsky District, Vologda Oblast =

Ivonino Ивонино
- Village
- Location within Vologda Oblast Location within Russia
- Coordinates: 58°44′N 41°00′E
- Country: Russia
- Region: Vologda Oblast
- District: Gryazovetsky District
- Time zone: UTC+3:00

Ivonino (Russian: Ивонино) is a rural locality (a village) in Sidorovskoye Rural Settlement, Gryazovetsky District, Vologda Oblast, Russia. The population was 5 as of 2002.

== Geography ==
Ivonino is located 54 km (34 mi) southeast of Gryazovets (the district's administrative centre) by road. Goritsy is the nearest rural locality.
