= Vosya (village) =

Vosya Восья
- Village
- Location within Vologda Oblast Location within Russia
- Coordinates: 58°59′N 41°10′E
- Country: Russia
- Region: Vologda Oblast
- District: Gryazovetsky District
- Time zone: UTC+3:00

Vosya (Russian: Восья) is a rural locality (a village) in Vokhtozhskoye Rural Settlement, Gryazovetsky District, Vologda Oblast, Russia. The population was 7 as of 2002.

== Geography ==
It is located 92 km northeast of Gryazovets (the district's administrative centre) by road. Vosya (settlement) is the nearest rural locality.
