= Baksheyka =

Baksheyka Бакшейка
- Village
- Location within Vologda Oblast Location within Russia
- Coordinates: 59°00′N 40°07′E
- Country: Russia
- Region: Vologda Oblast
- District: Gryazovetsky District
- Time zone: UTC+3:00

Baksheyka (Russian: Бакшейка) is a rural locality (a village) in Pertsevskoye Rural Settlement, Gryazovetsky District, Vologda Oblast, Russia. The population was 18 as of 2002.

== Geography ==
Baksheyka is located 21 km (13 mi) north of Gryazovets (the district's administrative centre) by road. Medvedevo is the nearest rural locality.
