= Klikunovo =

Klikunovo Кликуново
- Village
- Location within Vologda Oblast Location within Russia
- Coordinates: 59°03′N 40°20′E
- Country: Russia
- Region: Vologda Oblast
- District: Gryazovetsky District
- Time zone: UTC+3:00

Klikunovo (Russian: Кликуново) is a rural locality (a village) in Komyanskoye Rural Settlement, Gryazovetsky District, Vologda Oblast, Russia. The population was 2 as of 2002.

== Geography ==
Klikunovo is located 31 km (19 mi) north of Gryazovets (the district's administrative centre) by road. Ryabinovka is the nearest rural locality.
