= Kashino, Gryazovetsky District, Vologda Oblast =

Kashino Кашино
- Village
- Location within Vologda Oblast Location within Russia
- Coordinates: 59°06′N 40°26′E
- Country: Russia
- Region: Vologda Oblast
- District: Gryazovetsky District
- Time zone: UTC+3:00

Kashino (Russian: Кашино) is a rural locality (a village) in Komyanskoye Rural Settlement, Gryazovetsky District, Vologda Oblast, Russia. The population was 12 as of 2002.

== Geography ==
Kashino is located 35 km (22 mi) northeast of Gryazovets (the district's administrative centre) by road. Nadorozhny Lipovik is the nearest rural locality.
