= Shnyakino =

Shnyakino Шнякино
- Village
- Location within Vologda Oblast Location within Russia
- Coordinates: 58°59′N 39°58′E
- Country: Russia
- Region: Vologda Oblast
- District: Gryazovetsky District
- Time zone: UTC+3:00

Shnyakino (Russian: Шнякино) is a rural locality (a village) in Pertsevskoye Rural Settlement, Gryazovetsky District, Vologda Oblast, Russia. The population was 4 as of 2002.

== Geography ==
Shnyakino is located 25 km northwest of Gryazovets (the district's administrative centre) by road. Moshennikovo is the nearest rural locality.
