= Kornilyevskaya Sloboda =

Kornilyevskaya Sloboda Корнильевская Слобода
- Village
- Location within Vologda Oblast Location within Russia
- Coordinates: 58°50′N 40°13′E
- Country: Russia
- Region: Vologda Oblast
- District: Gryazovetsky District
- Time zone: UTC+3:00

Kornilyevskaya Sloboda (Russian: Корнильевская Слобода) is a rural locality (a village) in Rostilovskoye Rural Settlement, Gryazovetsky District, Vologda Oblast, Russia. The population was 14 as of 2002.

== Geography ==
Kornilyevskaya Sloboda is located 6 km (3.7 mi) southwest of Gryazovets (the district's administrative centre) by road. Svistunovo is the nearest rural locality.
