= Rostilovo =

Rostilovo Ростилово
- Village
- Location within Vologda Oblast Location within Russia
- Coordinates: 58°47′N 40°15′E
- Country: Russia
- Region: Vologda Oblast
- District: Gryazovetsky District
- Time zone: UTC+3:00

Rostilovo (Russian: Ростилово) is a rural locality (a village) and the administrative center of Rostilovskoye Rural Settlement, Gryazovetsky District, Vologda Oblast, Russia. The population was only 564 as of 2002. There are 3 streets.

== Geography ==
Rostilovo is located 9 km south of Gryazovets (the district's administrative centre) by road. Basargino is the nearest rural locality.
