= Semeykino =

Semeykino Семейкино
- Village
- Location within Vologda Oblast Location within Russia
- Coordinates: 58°57′N 39°44′E
- Country: Russia
- Region: Vologda Oblast
- District: Gryazovetsky District
- Time zone: UTC+3:00

Semeykino (Russian: Семейкино) is a rural locality (a village) in Pertsevskoye Rural Settlement, Gryazovetsky District, Vologda Oblast, Russia. The population was 2 as of 2002.

== Geography ==
Semeykino is located 38 km northwest of Gryazovets (the district's administrative centre) by road. Ovinishcha is the nearest rural locality.
