= Sidorovskoye =

Sidorovskoye Сидоровское
- Village
- Location within Vologda Oblast Location within Russia
- Coordinates: 58°43′N 40°23′E
- Country: Russia
- Region: Vologda Oblast
- District: Gryazovetsky District
- Time zone: UTC+3:00

Sidorovskoye (Russian: Сидоровское) is a rural locality (a village) in Rostilovskoye Rural Settlement, Gryazovetsky District, Vologda Oblast, Russia. The population was 142 as of 2002. There are 2 streets.

== Geography ==
Sidorovskoye is located 23 km south of Gryazovets (the district's administrative centre) by road. Martyakovo is the nearest rural locality.
