= Kanevo =

Kanevo Канево
- Village
- Location within Vologda Oblast Location within Russia
- Coordinates: 58°55′N 40°42′E
- Country: Russia
- Region: Vologda Oblast
- District: Gryazovetsky District
- Time zone: UTC+3:00

Kanevo (Russian: Канево) is a rural locality (a village) in Sidorovskoye Rural Settlement, Gryazovetsky District, Vologda Oblast, Russia. The population was 6 as of 2002.

== Geography ==
Kanevo is located 39 km (24 mi) northeast of Gryazovets (the district's administrative centre) by road. Zasechnoye is the nearest rural locality.
