= Kurapovo =

Kurapovo Курапово
- Village
- Location within Vologda Oblast Location within Russia
- Coordinates: 58°59′N 40°17′E
- Country: Russia
- Region: Vologda Oblast
- District: Gryazovetsky District
- Time zone: UTC+3:00

Kurapovo (Russian: Курапово) is a rural locality (a village) in Komyanskoye Rural Settlement, Gryazovetsky District, Vologda Oblast, Russia. The population was 5 as of 2002.

== Geography ==
Kurapovo is located 24 km (15 mi) north of Gryazovets (the district's administrative centre) by road. Khvastovo is the nearest rural locality.
