= Martyakovo =

Martyakovo Мартяково
- Village
- Location within Vologda Oblast Location within Russia
- Coordinates: 58°42′N 40°22′E
- Country: Russia
- Region: Vologda Oblast
- District: Gryazovetsky District
- Time zone: UTC+3:00

Martyakovo (Russian: Мартяково) is a rural locality (a village) in Rostilovskoye Rural Settlement, Gryazovetsky District, Vologda Oblast, Russia. The population was 4 as of 2002.

== Geography ==
Martyakovo is located 24 km south of Gryazovets (the district's administrative centre) by road. Sidorovskoye is the nearest rural locality.
