= Munikovo =

Munikovo Муниково
- Village
- Location within Vologda Oblast Location within Russia
- Coordinates: 58°51′N 41°10′E
- Country: Russia
- Region: Vologda Oblast
- District: Gryazovetsky District
- Time zone: UTC+3:00

Munikovo (Russian: Муниково) is a rural locality (a village) in Vokhtozhskoye Rural Settlement, Gryazovetsky District, Vologda Oblast, Russia. The population was 17 as of 2002.

== Geography ==
Munikovo is located 76 km east of Gryazovets (the district's administrative centre) by road. Melenka is the nearest rural locality.
