= Skalino =

Skalino Скалино
- Village
- Location within Vologda Oblast Location within Russia
- Coordinates: 58°34′N 40°14′E
- Country: Russia
- Region: Vologda Oblast
- District: Gryazovetsky District
- Time zone: UTC+3:00

Skalino (Russian: Скалино) is a rural locality (a village) in Rostilovskoye Rural Settlement, Gryazovetsky District, Vologda Oblast, Russia. The population was 37 as of 2002.

== Geography ==
Skalino is located 40 km south of Gryazovets (the district's administrative centre) by road. Polyanka is the nearest rural locality.
