= Bolshoy Dor =

Bolshoy Dor Большой Дор
- Village
- Location within Vologda Oblast Location within Russia
- Coordinates: 58°44′N 40°57′E
- Country: Russia
- Region: Vologda Oblast
- District: Gryazovetsky District
- Time zone: UTC+3:00

Bolshoy Dor (Russian: Большой Дор) is a rural locality (a village) in Sidorovskoye Rural Settlement, Gryazovetsky District, Vologda Oblast, Russia. The population was 10 as of 2002.

== Geography ==
Bolshoy Dor is located 51 km (32 mi) southeast of Gryazovets (the district's administrative centre) by road. Bekrenevo is the nearest rural locality.
