= Gavrakovo =

Gavrakovo Гавраково
- Village
- Location within Vologda Oblast Location within Russia
- Coordinates: 58°46′N 40°27′E
- Country: Russia
- Region: Vologda Oblast
- District: Gryazovetsky District
- Time zone: UTC+3:00

Gavrakovo (Russian: Гавраково) is a rural locality (a village) in Pertsevskoye Rural Settlement, Gryazovetsky District, Vologda Oblast, Russia. The population was 2 as of 2002.

== Geography ==
Gavrakovo is located 23 km (14 mi) southeast of Gryazovets (the district's administrative centre) by road. Volosatovo is the nearest rural locality.
