= Myasnikovka =

Myasnikovka Мясниковка
- Passing loop
- Location within Vologda Oblast Location within Russia
- Coordinates: 58°57′N 40°13′E
- Country: Russia
- Region: Vologda Oblast
- District: Gryazovetsky District
- Time zone: UTC+3:00

Myasnikovka (Russian: Мясниковка) is a rural locality (a passing loop) in Pertsevskoye Rural Settlement, Gryazovetsky District, Vologda Oblast, Russia. The population was 14 as of 2002.

== Geography ==
Myasnikovka is located 10 km north of Gryazovets (the district's administrative centre) by road. Myasnikovo is the nearest rural locality.
