= Koshkino =

Koshkino Кошкино
- Village
- Location within Vologda Oblast Location within Russia
- Coordinates: 58°56′N 40°34′E
- Country: Russia
- Region: Vologda Oblast
- District: Gryazovetsky District
- Time zone: UTC+3:00

Koshkino (Russian: Кошкино) is a rural locality (a village) in Pertsevskoye Rural Settlement, Gryazovetsky District, Vologda Oblast, Russia. The population was 11 as of 2002.

== Geography ==
Koshkino is located 34 km (21 mi) northeast of Gryazovets (the district's administrative centre) by road. Blazny is the nearest rural locality.
