= Ryabinovka, Vologda Oblast =

Village in Vologda Oblast, Russia

Ryabinovka Рябиновка
- Village
- Location within Vologda Oblast Location within Russia
- Coordinates: 59°02′N 40°20′E
- Country: Russia
- Region: Vologda Oblast
- District: Gryazovetsky District
- Time zone: UTC+3:00

Ryabinovka (Russian: Рябиновка) is a rural locality (a village) in Komyanskoye Rural Settlement, Gryazovetsky District, Vologda Oblast, Russia. The population was 2 as of 2002.

== Geography ==
Ryabinovka is located 27 km north of Gryazovets (the district's administrative centre) by road. Maloye Denisyevo is the nearest rural locality.
