= Paltsevo, Gryazovetsky District, Vologda Oblast =

Paltsevo Пальцево
- Village
- Location within Vologda Oblast Location within Russia
- Coordinates: 58°58′N 40°20′E
- Country: Russia
- Region: Vologda Oblast
- District: Gryazovetsky District
- Time zone: UTC+3:00

Paltsevo (Russian: Пальцево) is a rural locality (a village) in Komyanskoye Rural Settlement, Gryazovetsky District, Vologda Oblast, Russia. The population was 1 as of 2002.

== Geography ==
Paltsevo is located 27 km north of Gryazovets (the district's administrative centre) by road. Semerino is the nearest rural locality.
