= Gryazovetsky District =

Gryazovetsky District Грязовецкий район
- District
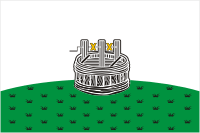
- Flag Coat of arms
- Location of Gryazovetsky District in Vologda Oblast
- Coordinates: 58°53′N 40°15′E
- Country: Russia
- Federal subject: Vologda Oblast
- Established: July 15, 1929
- Administrative center: Gryazovets

Area
  - Total: 5,030 km^{2} (1,940 sq mi)

Population (2010 Census)
  - Total: 36,820
  - Density: 7.32/km^{2} (19.0/sq mi)
  - Urban: 59.5%
  - Rural: 40.5%

Administrative structure
  - Administrative divisions: 1 Towns of district significance, 1 Urban-type settlements, 16 Selsoviets
  - Inhabited localities: 1 cities/towns, 1 urban-type settlements, 511 rural localities

Municipal structure
  - Municipally incorporated as: Gryazovetsky Municipal District
  - Municipal divisions: 2 urban settlements, 5 rural settlements
- Time zone: UTC+3 (MSK)
- OKTMO ID: 19624000
- Website: http://www.gradm.ru/

Gryazovetsky District (Russian: Гря́зовецкий райо́н) is an administrative and municipal district (raion), one of the twenty-six in Vologda Oblast, Russia. It is located in the south of the oblast and borders with Mezhdurechensky District in the north, Soligalichsky and Buysky Districts of Kostroma Oblast in the east, Lyubimsky and Pervomaysky Districts of Yaroslavl Oblast in the south, Poshekhonsky District, also of Yaroslavl Oblast, in the southeast, and with Vologodsky District in the northwest. The area of the district is 5,030 square kilometers (1,940 sq mi). Its administrative center is the town of Gryazovets. Population: 36,820 (2010 Census); 41,644 (2002 Census); 47,136 (1989 Soviet census). The population of Gryazovets accounts for 42.2% of the district's total population.

== Geography ==
The district occupies the southern corner of Vologda Oblast. Most of the district's territory lies on the Gryazovets Plateau, which is cut through by rivers and is of glacial origin. The plateau lies on the divide between the drainage basins of the Sukhona and Volga Rivers, and thus on the divide between the basins of the Arctic Ocean and the Caspian Sea. The southern part of the district lies in the basin of the Obnora River, a tributary of the Kostroma River. Some areas in the southeast of the district are in the basin of various tributaries of the Kostroma as well. The geographical center of the district is situated in the basin of the Lezha River, a right tributary of the Sukhona, which has its source in Kostroma Oblast and crosses the district from south to north, forming its largest waterway. The biggest lake in the district, Lake Nikolskoye, is a source of the Komela River, a left tributary of the Lezha. Minor areas in the east of the district belong to the basins of the tributaries of the Sukhona, and minor areas in the northwest of the district are in the basin of the Vologda River, a right tributary of the Sukhona.

== History ==
In the 15th century, the area became a part of the Grand Duchy of Moscow. The area was attractive for monks, since it was at the time covered by unpopulated forests. A number of influential monasteries were founded within the current limits of the district, including the Pavlo-Obnorsky Monastery in the 15th century and the Korniliyevo-Komelsky Monastery. Gryazovets was first mentioned in 1538 as a settlement dependent on the Korniliyevo-Komelsky Monastery.

In the course of the administrative reform carried out in 1708 by Peter the Great, the area was included into Archangelgorod Governorate. In 1780, the governorate was abolished and transformed into Vologda Viceroyalty. Simultaneously, in 1780, Gryazovets was chartered and became the seat of Gryazovetsky Uyezd. The viceroyalty was abolished in 1796, and its part which included Gryazovetsky Uyezd became Vologda Governorate. In 1924, the uyezd was abolished, and the area was included into Vologodsky Uyezd.

On July 15, 1929, several governorates, including Vologda Governorate, were merged into Northern Krai, and the uyezds were abolished. Instead, Gryazovetsky District with the administrative center in the town of Gryazovets was established as a part of Vologda Okrug. In the following years, the first-level administrative division of Russia kept changing. In 1936, Northern Krai was transformed into Northern Oblast. In 1937, Northern Oblast was split into Arkhangelsk Oblast and Vologda Oblast. Gryazovetsky District remained in Vologda Oblast ever since.

On January 25, 1935, Lezhsky District was established on the territory split off from Gryazovetsky District. The administrative center of the district became the selo of Sidorovo, and between 1938 and 1952 the administrative center was located in the settlement of Lezha. In 1959, the district was abolished and merged into Gryazovetsky District.

== Administrative and municipal divisions ==
Municipal divisions of Gryazovetsky Municipal District

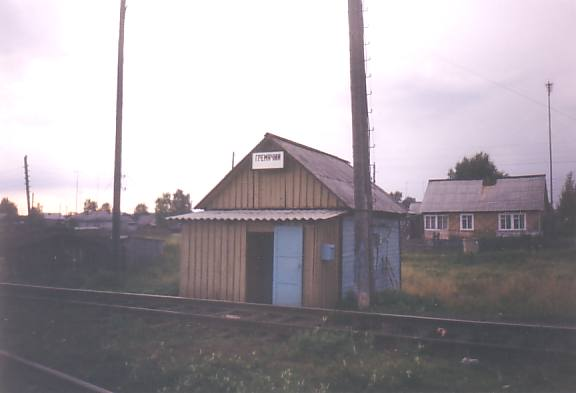
The Monza Railroad station in the settlement of Gremyachy, which is administratively a part of Gryazovetsky District, but municipally is a part of Totemsky Municipal District

As an administrative division, the district is divided into one town of district significance (Gryazovets), one urban-type settlement (Vokhtoga), and sixteen selsoviets. Within the framework of municipal divisions, most of the district is incorporated as Gryazovetsky Municipal District and is divided into two urban and five rural settlements. However, four rural localities of the administrative district are municipally incorporated elsewhere: two (the settlements of Ida and Kordon) are a part of Babushkinsky Municipal District, and the other two (the settlements of Gremyachy and Karitsa) are a part of Totemsky Municipal District.

== Economy ==
=== Industry ===
The economy of the district is based on timber industry. There is also food industry.

=== Agriculture ===
The agriculture of the district is essentially limited to crop growing and cattle breeding, resulting and meat and milk production.

=== Transportation ===
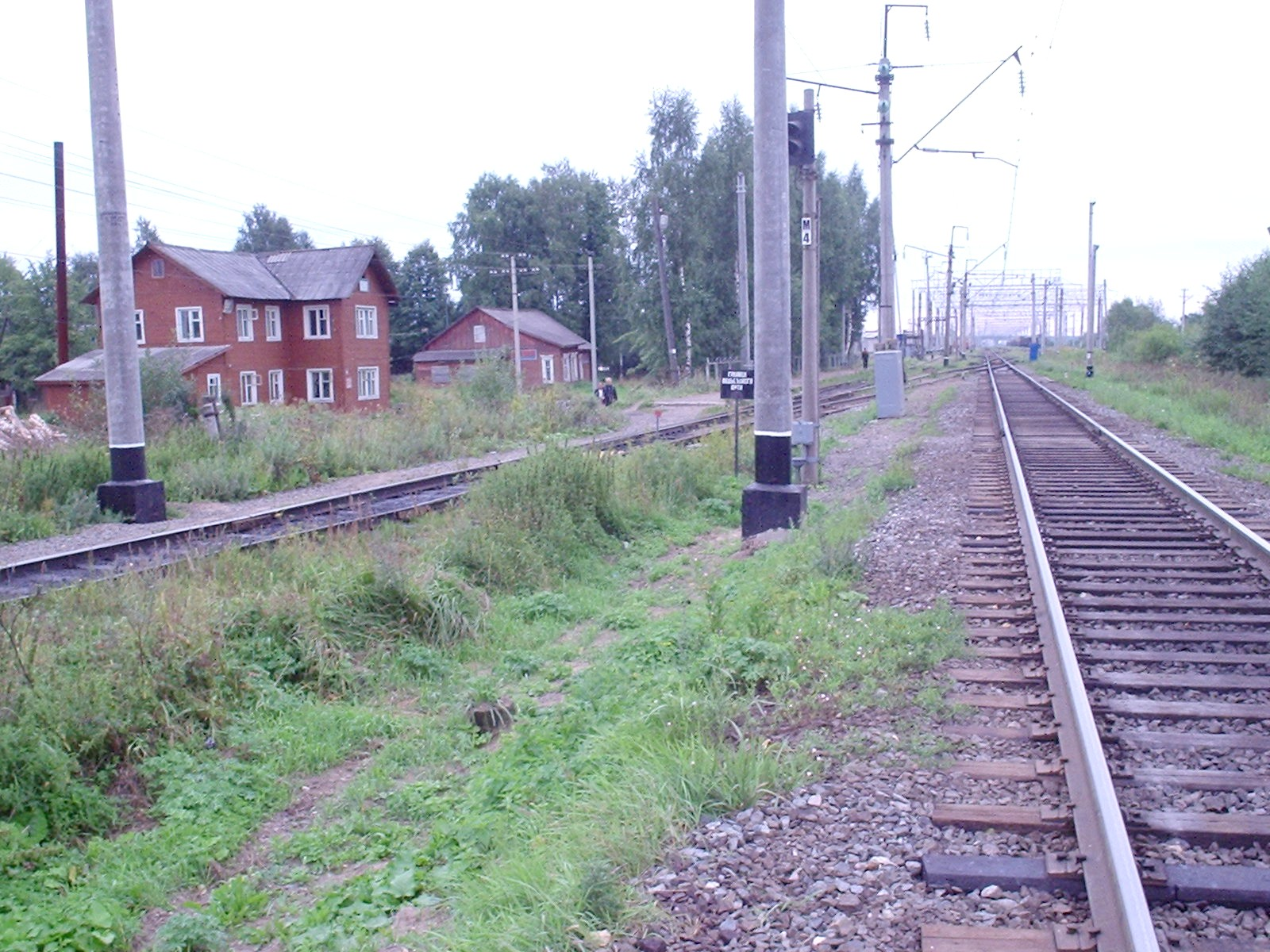
Vokhtoga railway station seen from the north. The railway straight up continues to Buy, the left track is the beginning of the Monza Railroad.

One of the principal highways in Russia, M8, which connects Moscow and Arkhangelsk, crosses the district from south to north, passing Gryazovets. There are also local roads, with the bus traffic originating from Gryazovets.

The railroad connecting Yaroslavl and Vologda crosses the district from south to north. Gryazovets is the main railroad station within the district. There is also another line, which connects Vologda in the north and Buy in the south, with the main station within the district being Vokhtoga. At Vokhtoga, another railroad branches off east, the Monza Railroad, built for timber transport and operated by the timber production authorities, which runs along the border of Vologda and Kostroma Oblasts. The Monza railroad crosses the district and enters Mezhdurechensky District, eventually continuing to the southeastern districts of Vologda Oblast. The plans to extend it further east to Nikolsk were never realized.

== Culture and recreation ==
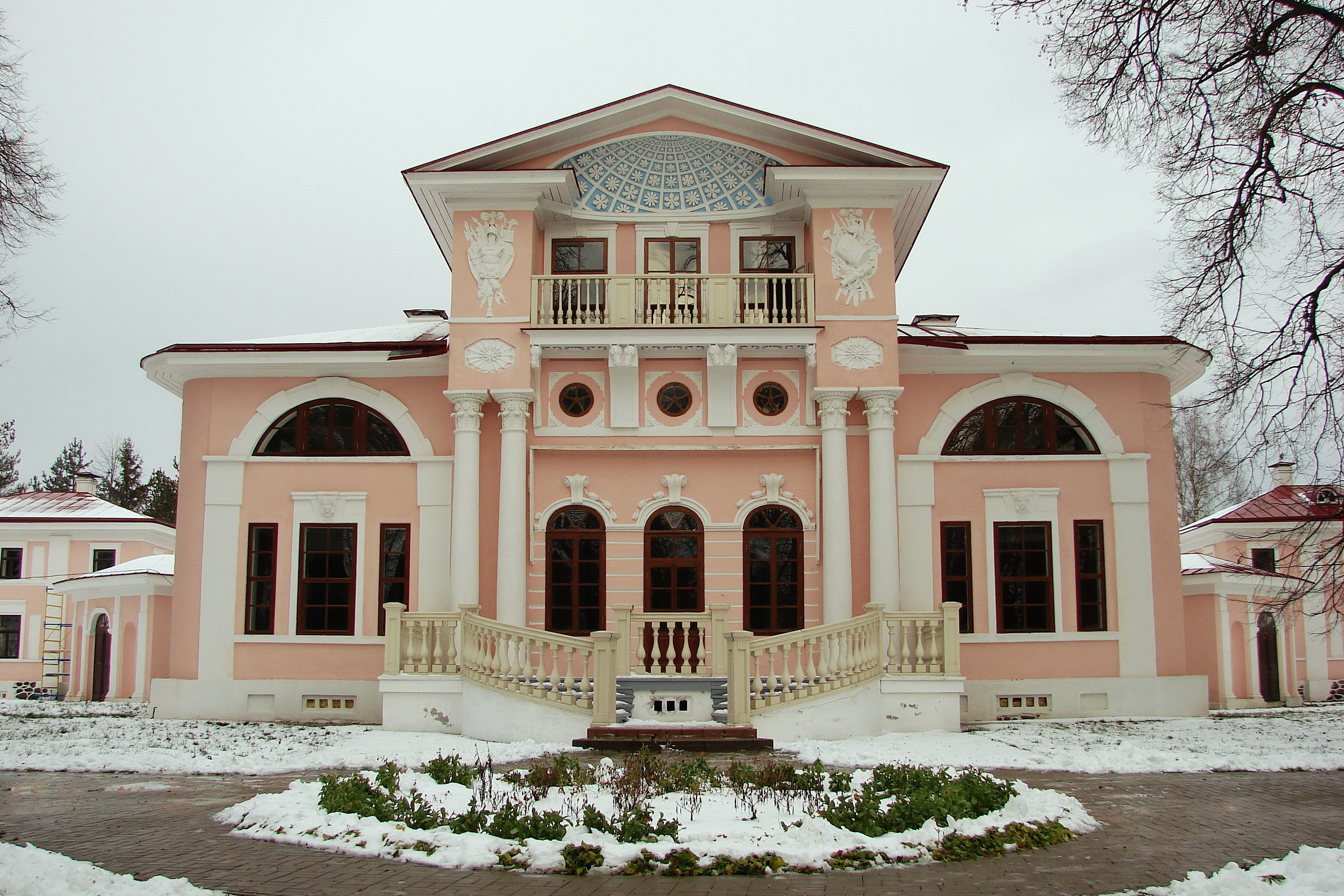
The main house of the Bryanchaninov Estate, Pokrovskoye

The district contains four objects classified as cultural and historical heritage by Russian Federal law and additionally ninety objects classified as cultural and historical heritage of local importance (fifty of them in Gryazovets). The objects protected at the federal level are the Intercession Church and the Bryanchaninov Estate, both located in the selo of Pokrovskoye, and the building of the secondary school in Gryazovets.

Ignatius Bryanchaninov, who later became an Orthodox bishop and is now venerated as a saint by the Russian Orthodox Church, was born in Pokrovskoye.

The center of the town of Gryazovets mainly preserved the historical buildings from the 19th century.

The only museum in the district is the Gryazovets District Museum, located in Gryazovets.
