= Yamaltransstroy =

Yamaltransstroy JSC
- Company type: Open Joint-Stock Company
- Industry: Construction (ISIC: F)
- Founded: 1985
- Headquarters: Moscow, Russia
- Key people: Vladimir Nak; Igor Nak
- Operating income: 9.4 bln roubles (2010, Russian GAAP)
- Number of employees: 3000
- Website: www.yamaltransstroy.com

Yamaltransstroy JSC (Russian: Ямалтрансстрой) is a Russian construction company, general contractor of Gazprom for construction and operation of the railway line on Yamal to Bovanenkovo, Kharasavey and Novoport deposits. The head office is in Moscow with a company branch in Labytnangi.

== History ==
In 1985, the construction and installation union Yamaltransstroy was founded with the aim of constructing railways in the far north of Western Siberia.

In 1986, construction started on the Obskaya-Bovanenkovo railway line with a length of 509 km to the gas condensate deposits at Kharasavey Cape. The track is located completely beyond the Arctic Circle in permafrost conditions, and is one of the most difficult railway tracks due to geological, climatological and natural conditions.

In 1992, the enterprise became a joint-stock company.

In 2009, the company completed the construction of a 4-kilometre bridge crossing the River Yuribey (334th km of the track), one of the most difficult engineering facilities beyond the Arctic Circle.

By 2010–2011, the track was practically completed and revenues of the company fell by half, reduced to 9.4 billion roubles in 2010.

== Owners and management ==
In 1992, head of the production construction and installation union (PSMO) Vladimir Nak was elected General Director of PSMO Yamaltransstroy. In April 1997, his son Igor Nak became General Director of Yamaltransstroy JSC.

As of the end of 2011, around 82% of the company is controlled by organisations of Igor Nak, and negotiations were conducted about the sale of Nak's share to Stroygazconsulting of Ziyad Manasir.
