= Economic development of the Arctic zone of the Russian Federation =

The Arctic zone of Russia is the territory of its Extreme North, which is the largest among the Arctic states. It includes land, territorial waters and continental shelf of the seas of the Arctic Ocean. If the Arctic Circle is considered the southern boundary of the Arctic, it covers an area of over 9 million km^{2} (3.5 million sq mi), of which almost 7 million km^{2} (2.7 million sq mi) is water. In the Russian Arctic, developed territories beyond the Arctic Circle and near it coexist with reserves of untouched nature. The territories of the following parts of Russia – the Arkhangelsk and Murmansk Oblasts, the Sakha and Komi Republics, the Krasnoyarsk Territory, the Nenets, Yamalo-Nenets and Chukotka Autonomous Regions, with a combined population of over 1 million people – are fully or partly included in the Arctic zone.

Economic interest in the region is due to the possibilities of extracting ores and hydrocarbons. In the Russian segment of the Arctic, 20% of GDP and 22% of total exports are produced. The cost of explored and projected mineral resources exceeds 15 trillion dollars. The western sector of the Russian Arctic dominates in the exploration and production of minerals, raw materials, and fuel.

The least studied areas are the shelves of the eastern seas of the area, namely the Laptev, East Siberian and Chukchi Seas. No exploratory wells have been drilled on the shelves of these seas.

== Changes in economic functions of the Arctic ==
From the 18th and 19th centuries to the beginning of the 20th century, bioresource functions (fur and food) prevailed, the main productions were hunting and fishing. Since the 19th century, the region's transportation infrastructure developed, satisfying not only national but also global interest. Since 1930, military and defense functions have been strengthened. Currently, the mineral resource function of economy is leading.

== International projects ==
Resource and raw materials corporations form the basis of the economy of the Arctic. In the territory of the region, large-scale industrial projects are being developed and implemented, in which Gazprom, Severstal, Norilsk Nickel and others are involved.

In 2008, for development of the Shtokman gas condensate field and the Lomonosov submarine ridge, the international consortium Shtokman Development was created. 51% of its shares belong to Gazprom, 25% to the French Total and 24% to the Norwegian Statoil. Chinese and other partners are also invited, as the total capital expenditures are estimated at $250–300 billion. 22 billion m^{3} (780 billion cu ft) of gas is mined annually.

In May 2012, Rosneft and Statoil signed an agreement on cooperation for joint work on the Russian shelf of the Barents (Perseevsky section) and Okhotsk (Kashevarovsky, Lisyansky, and Magadan-1 sections) seas. In the Russian shelf projects, the Norwegian company received 33.3%. It also pays for geological exploration. In June 2012, Rosneft and Statoil agreed to work on fields with difficult oil in Russia.

In 2011–2013, agreements were concluded between Rosneft, BP, ExxonMobil and General Electric for the exploration and development of several East-Prinovozemelsky sites in the Kara Sea (total reserves of about 4.9 billion tons of oil and 8.3 billion m^{3} (290 billion cu ft) of gas), and plots in Western Siberia.

In May 2013, Rosneft signed an agreement with the Vietnamese company PV Oil hocks kah Dung Quất refinery in Vietnam. Supplies of oil are planned from 2014 to 2039 to a maximum of 6 million ton per year. In May 2016, Rosneft and PV Oil signed an agreement on cooperation in Russia, Vietnam and third countries in the field of oil and gas exploration, production, refining, commerce and logistics.

Since 2014 sanctions were imposed on Russian companies Rosneft and Gazprom, from countries of the European Union, Norway, the US and Canada. Therefore, interstate cooperation in the economic and technological fields in the development of resources of the Russian Arctic shelf was actually curtailed. One of the problems of resource development in the Arctic zone of the Russian Federation is the lack of offshore installations, which leads to the transfer of most of the drilling work to foreign companies. At the same time, the interest of such countries as China, India, Vietnam in joint exploration and extraction of fuel resources of the Russian Arctic is growing.

In the mineral resource base of the Russian Arctic there are oil and gas bearing and coal-bearing fields, large and unique deposits of ferrous, non-ferrous, noble and rare metals, agrochemical ores, jewelry and ornamental stones and other types of mineral raw materials (see following table).

Economically important are field giants: coal (Urengoiskoye, Bovanenkovskoye, Yamburgskoye, Kharasaveiskoye, Samotlor, Krasnoleninskoye, and others) and ore (Khibiny, Lovozerskaya, Talnakhskoye, Oktyabrskoe, Tomtor, Sarylahskoe, Natalkinskoye). The Arctic regions provide about 65% of foreign exchange earnings to the state treasury and here are unlimited reserves of their increase.

Mineral resources of the Russian Arctic
Groups	Types of raw materials	Mineral resources
Fuel energetic resources	solid fuel energy raw materials liquid and gaseous fuel and energy raw materials	coal, uranium, oil shale, methane in gas hydrate deposits oil, gas condensate, combustible gases, natural bitumens
Mineral resources: metallic minerals non-metallic minerals	black metals non-ferrous metals rare and rare earth metals noble metals mining and chemical raw materials mining and technical raw materials gemstones organic raw materials	iron manganese, titanium, chromium, vanadium, aluminum, bismuth, tungsten, copper, tin, molybdenum, nickel, cobalt, mercury, antimony, lead, zinc, selenium, tellurium beryllium, lithium, niobium, tantalum, zirconium, lanthanides gold, silver, platinum group metals phosphate rock, apatite, mineral salts, arsenic abrasives, barite, graphite, mica diamonds, jeweler mammoth bone, amber

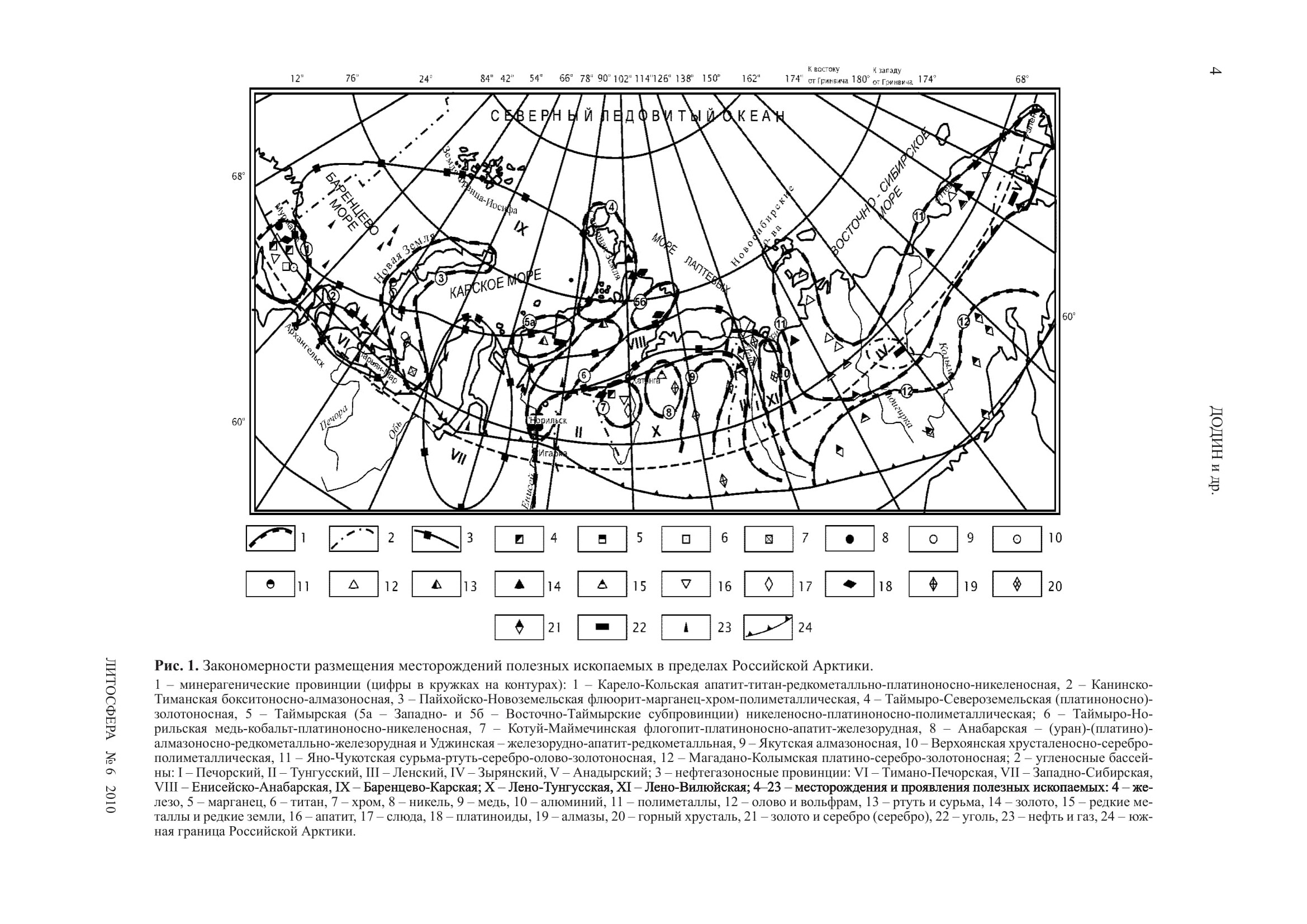
Patterns of location of mineral deposits within the Russian Arctic zone.

== Mineral and hydrocarbon reserves ==
From all-Russian reserves: 40% gold, 80% oil, 50–90% gas, nickel, copper, antimony, cobalt, tin, tungsten, mercury, apatite, phlogopite, 90% chromium and manganese, 99% platinum metals, 100% indigenous diamonds and vermiculite;

From global reserves: 30% of diamonds and natural gas, 20% of nickel, 50% of apatite, 35% of niobium, 15% of copper, platinum metals and tin, 10% of oil (without shelf) and cobalt, 6 - 8% of tungsten and mercury;

- from all-Russian mining: 99 - 100% of diamonds, antimony, apatite concentrate, phlogopite, vermiculite, rare and rarely ground metals, 97% platinum, 95% gas, 90% nickel, 60–80% oil and copper.

== Oil and gas ==
The first gas production on land in the Russian Arctic began in 1969 in the north of the Krasnoyarsk Territory at the Messoyakhskoye field. In 1972, gas production began in the oil and gas condensate field Medvezhye, which has been transported since 1974 to the European part of Russia.

In the Arctic region at West Siberian province supplies of oil (over 70% of Russia's reserves) and natural gas (about 80%) and by the beginning of the 21st century. More than 7.5 billion tons of oil were extracted, of which 2 billion tons - from the Samotlor field. The Urengoi, Yamburgskoye, Zapolyarnoye, Kharasaveyskoye and South Tambeyskoye oil reserves, as well as the Bovanenkovskoye, Russkoye, Novoportovskoye, Sutorminskoye, Tarasovskoye, Severo-Komsomolskoye, Kharampurskoye natural gas fields, are unique in oil reserves in the North of Siberia.

== Gas supergiants ==
Bolshoy Urengoy and North Urengoyskoye (combined reserves of more than 11 trillion m3), Yamburgsko-Kharvutinskoe (reserves of over 6 trillion m3), Medveshye (2 trillion m3).

In 2012, Gazprom began developing the Bovanenkovo field, the first and largest (gas reserves are 4.9 trillion m3) on the Yamal Peninsula. The maximum design level of production will reach 115-140 billion m3. In 2014, Lukoil began the development of one of the largest oil fields of Western Siberia - Imilorsky with reserves of 190 million ton.

Hydrocarbon resources of the shelf zone of the Russian Arctic. At present, the continental shelf of the country is the only large reserve of hydrocarbon raw materials with which the prospects for the further development of the country's resource base are associated. The recoverable oil and natural gas resources of the Russian Arctic shelf amount to more than 83 billion tons, including about 13 billion tons of oil and condensate and more than 70 trillion tons m3 of natural gas. This is almost 90% of the resources of all water areas of the country.

Yurkharovskoye field (since 2003) opened in the 1970s, is located in the waters of the Taz Bay of the Kara Sea. This field is the main production asset of Novatek, which provides over 60% of gas production and about 40% of the company's liquid hydrocarbon production. Prirazlomnoye oil (since 2013) reservoir formation was discovered in 1989. It is located in the southeastern part of the Barents Sea, on the Pechora Sea shelf, 60 km from the coast. Oil reserves exceed 70 million tons. The field is being developed by Gazprom from the offshore ice-resistant stationary platform Prirazlomnoye, from which 40 inclined wells have been drilled. In 2014, over 300 thousand tons of oil was produced there. For the export of oil, Lukoil in June 2008 put into operation the Varandey stationary offshore ice-resistant offshore export terminal. Ice-resistant offshore export terminal - a unique object, operating year-round in harsh climatic conditions. It is the northernmost oil terminal in the world (69˚ 05 'N), as recorded in the Guinness Book of Records. Its capacity is 12 million tons of oil per year. The terminal is located 22 km from the coast, which is connected by two threads of underwater pipelines. With the help of tankers, oil is delivered to the Murmansk region, from where it is exported.

According to the estimates of OPEC and the International Energy Agency, by 2040 the consumption of primary energy by the population of the Earth will increase compared to 2010 by 40 - 60%. At the same time, oil will still occupy a leading place in the global energy balance. In 2040, a significant proportion of oil and gas consumption will come from fields that have not yet been explored. The platinoid-copper-nickel-cobalt deposits group is represented by Norilsk-1, Talnakh and Oktyabrsky. In total, they provide 85% of proven nickel reserves in the Russian Arctic. About 15% of reserves are accounted for by the Karelian-Kola group of fields, the development of which is provided by Pechenganikel. Along the way, iridium, selenium, tellurium, ruthenium, gold, silver, sulfur, palladium are mined here. In terms of nickel reserves and production (358.4 thousand tons in 2008), produced mainly (~ 90%) in the Russian Arctic. However, reserves of rich ores Norilsk Combine (the main production facility) provided only 12 – 15 years, after which the testing of sulfide of nickel ores may become uneconomical. In this regard, the discovery of new deposits of rich ores in the Norilsk region is becoming a priority task not only of Russian, but also of world importance.

== Diamonds ==
Industrial diamond content was established in the coastal areas of the Western Arctic (White and Barents Seas) and the South Lapland shelf areas. Their potential resources are estimated: 6.5 million carats for the White and Barents Sea shelves, 38.6 million carats for the Laptev Sea shelf. Onshore Arctic, diamond deposits are being developed in the Arkhangelsk Region and the Republic of Sakha (Yakutia). Four kimberlite fields have been identified in the Arkhangelsk Province - Zolotnitskoe (pipe named Lomonosov, Karpinsky-1 and Karpinsky-2, Pionerskaya), Kepinsky, Melskoe and Verkhotinsky (named after named Griba). In the east of the Russian Arctic, in the Yakutsk diamondiferous province, a super-giant deposit of the Udachnaya pipe is being developed, which provides more than half of Russian diamond mining.

== Metals of the platinum group ==
Russian metal reserves, ranked second in the world after South Africa, put on the market about 50 - 65% of palladium and 12 - 20% of platinum (of the global total). These indicators have so far formed from Norilsk fields (148 tons mined in Russia).

== Phosphorus ==
The reserves of phosphate ores in Russia are in terms of P_{2}O_{5} 1.27 billion tons (third place in the world after Morocco and China), and two-thirds of reserves (816 million tons P_{2}O_{5}) are apatite ores and more than 40% of them (530 million ton) are concentrated in unique fields Khibinskaya group apatite-nepheline ores which are suitable for producing any types of phosphate fertilizers. Extraction is carried in mines Murmansk region, most of it (3.28 million tons of P_{2}O_{5}) are in the field Khibinskaya group and a lower (1.16 million tons of P_{2}O_{5}) - Kovdor in this 4.44 million tons of P_{2}O_{5}. In the Polar Urals region, Sofronovskoye and Nyarminskoye deposits have been discovered with total estimated resources of about 100 million tons. The potential resources of phosphate raw materials are located in Meymecha-Kotui (~ 600 million tons of P_{2}O_{5}) and Udzhinsk (>1 billion tons of P_{2}O_{5}) provinces.

== Gold ==
Gold deposits in the Russian Arctic were discovered on the Taimyr Peninsula and the Severnaya Zemlya Archipelago (Taimyr-Severozemelskaya gold-bearing province), as well as in the Murmansk region. The most promising gold deposits are found in polar Yakutia, in the Yana-Kolyma and Kolyma-Magadan provinces, as well as in the Chukotka Autonomous Region. The placer potential of gold in the shelf areas of Russia is comparable to its resources in large gold-bearing regions of the continental part of the country. 98% of the stocks of shelf gold are concentrated in the Arctic shelf areas. In Valkaraysky district there is a unique Ryveyemsky knot, which has been in operation since 1967, with residual total reserves and estimated metal resources of about 155 tons. Significantly less gold reserves (8 tons) in the alluvial area of the Bolshevik Island, Chelyuskinsky District. Gold deposits in the Krasnoyarsk Territory are the Grozny, Nizhnelitkinskoye and Zhilnoye primary gold deposits, which are rich with characteristics are far superior to the rest.

== Silver ==
In 2004, full-scale development of the Dukat deposit began, containing on average 450 g/ton of silver, 1 g/ton of gold and secured by reserves (~11 thousand tons) for 25 years. And of interest are the Prognoz deposits (4.4 thousand tons), Mangazeyskoye (~5 thousand tons), objects of the Norilsk ore cluster (~10 thousand tons). In Chukotka, gold-silver and silver-gold deposits (Mayskoye, Maple, Valunistoe, Kapelka, etc.) contain about 15 thousand tons of silver. Thus, only the reserves and resources of these objects reach 50 thousand tons of silver. Approximately it is about 80% of the silver of Russia.

== Antimony ==
More than two-thirds of the total Russian antimony reserves (292.4 thousand tons) are located in the Russian Arctic (the Sakha Republic in the fields of Sarylakh, Sentachan, Kim, Multan). The provision of reserves of the two largest fields in Russia - Sarylakhsky and Sentachansky is about 30 years.

== Rare and rare earth metals ==
Rare Earth metals are raw materials which can meet the needs of Russian industries and increase revenue from the high-tech exports. An example of such raw materials today are two unique natural objects in the Siberian Arctic (northwest of the Republic of Sakha (Yakutia) and northeast of Krasnoyarsk Krai). Complex deposits of rare and rare earth metals in the Tomtorskoe ore field with a supply of ohms of niobium, scandium and rare earth metals. Medium containing earth metal oxides - 9.53% niobium - 4.7%. This is one of the highest rates in the world and the highest in Russia. The development of Tomtor ore field objects allows to obtain rare-earth carbonates and the whole spectrum of oxides of the medium-heavy and heavy groups that are liquid on the world market (as well as niobium and scandium [1]. Field Skalnoe located within the Popigai meteorite crater. Reserves of rare-earth metals (zirconium, lithium, niobium, yttrium, beryllium, cerium, samarium, strontium) are developed along with other minerals in the Murmansk region. The Lovozero field contains one third of the Russian reserves of tantalum.

== Tin ==
Tin and tungsten resources in the Arctic Zone of Russian Federation are developed in the Komi Republic in the Polar Urals (Limpopo and Kholodnoye deposits), in Chukotka (Valkumeyskoye and Iultinskoe deposits) and in Yakutia (Deputieskoe deposit mining is carried out from Tyrekhtyakh placer deposit (224 tones) and Tyurtye miner deposit (224 tones) and in the deposit Churkoye deposit of Tyrekhtyakh (224 tones) and the Khurkoe deposit. Large Lyakhovsky alluvial area in the archipelago of the New Siberian Islands in view of the shelf 13 includes alluvial sites, including six large and medium. The total reserves of tin are up 106.5 thousand ton balance reserves of the country is provided approximately 100 years, 55 - 60% of the inventory of the country concentrated in CBA.

== Fossil Mammoth Bone ==
Siberian Mammoth Tusks (Mammuthus primigenius, Blumenbach, 1799) - an organic material from the group of gemstone-like materials forms industrial clusters in the Severokyakutsky bone-bearing province, covering the coastal lowland of the Yano-Kolyma interfluve, the Novosibirsk Islands and the adjacent shallow-water area of the East Arctic seas. The greatest concentration of bones is established in Lyakhovsky, Anzhu, Yansky, Indigirsky, Alazey areas, in recent years - in Kolymsky. While these same areas annually extracted from 25 to 50 tons of raw materials. The potential resources of the Severo-Yakutsk bone-bearing province with a total area of about 1 million km2 amount to about 450 thousand tons.

== Uranium deposits ==
Uranium deposits were discovered in the Taymyr (Kamenskoye field) and in the Murmansk region (Litsevskoe and Lovozero deposits).

== Kotelny Island coals ==
large deposits of Balyktakh, Tuguttakh and Tuoryurekhskoye (with possible open development) with a total estimated resource of 2.87 billion tons can be an energy base during the development of the archipelago. Brown coals, widely developed in sediments from the Late Cretaceous to the Miocene inclusive, are also suitable as fuel. The largest of the discovered Derevyannogorskoye deposits with estimated resources of 1.8 billion tons is located on the island of New Siberia.

== Biological resources of the Arctic ==
The region is rich in biological resources. Among them are fur-bearing animals (arctic fox, sable, mink, etc.). Reindeer livestock numbers in the millions. The largest populations of commercial fish — salmon, codfish and pollock — inhabit the Arctic seas; more than a third of Russian fish and seafood is harvested, about 20% of canned fish is produced.

== Conclusion ==
At present, the Arctic is moving from the northern periphery to the zone of economic development for all world powers. The importance of the Arctic region is determined by its role in the global economy due to natural resources. The consumption of natural gas in the next 15 – 20 years will increase (even growing interest in alternative sources of energy), the main reserves are concentrated in the Arctic zone (approximately 100 billion tons of fuel). Therefore, the development and use e resources of the Arctic Zone of Russian Federation is promising for the development of a diversified economy.

== Literature ==
- Kondratov, N.A. (2016). "Territorial Peculiarities of Location and Extractions of Mineral Resources Deposits in Russian Sector of the Arctic Region". Географический вестник = Geographical Bulletin. 3 (38): 35–48. doi:10.17072/2079-7877-2016-3-35-48. ISSN 2079-7877.
- Владимиров, М.М; Ноговицын, И.Д; Парников, А.М (2017). "Энергоэффективная усадьба в Арктической зоне России". doi:10.18411/svfu-2017-248.
- Торцев, Алексей Михайлович; Студёнов, Игорь Иванович (2019-07-03). "Теоретические Аспекты Инновационного Развития Регионов Арктической Зоны Российской Федерации". Региональные проблемы преобразования экономики (2): 87–93. doi:10.26726/1812-7096-2019-2-87-93. ISSN 1812-7096.
- Мазур И. И. Арктика-точка бифуркации в развитии глобального мира//Век глобализации 2/2010 pages 93–104
- Krajevitch, A.; Blot, P.; Cara, M. (1975). "[Transport of newborn infants. Apropos of 114 cases]". Annales de l'Anesthésiologie Française. 16 Spec No 1: 135–142. ISSN 0003-4061. PMID 2071.
- Isaacks, R. E.; Harkness, D. R.; Froeman, G. A.; Goldman, P. H.; Adler, J. L.; Sussman, S. A.; Roth, S. (1976). "Studies on avian erythrocyte metabolism--II. Relationship between the major phosphorylated metabolic intermediates and oxygen affinity of whole blood in chick embryos and chicks". Comparative Biochemistry and Physiology. A, Comparative Physiology. 53 (2): 151–156. doi:10.1016/s0300-9629(76)80046-1. ISSN 0300-9629. PMID 2411.
- Fauzer, V.V.; Smirnov, A.V. (2018). "The World's Arctic: Natural Resources, Population Distribution, Economics". Arctic: Ecology and Economy. 3 (31): 6–22. doi:10.25283/2223-4594-2018-3-6-22. ISSN 2223-4594.
- Ведомости 26 августа 2014
- Ведомости 16 июня 2016 г
- "Урсул А.Д., Марушевский Г.Б. Морально-этические проблемы человечества в перспективе перехода к устойчивому развитию". Проблемы общества и политики. 11 (11): 1–68. 2013. doi:10.7256/2306-0158.2013.11.10244. ISSN 2306-0158.
- Oil and gas research Institute of the RAS; Bogoyavlenskiy, Vasily; Bogoyavlenskiy, Igor; Oil and gas research Institute of the RAS; Nikonov, Roman; Oil and gas research Institute of the RAS (2017-09-14). "Results of aerial, space and field investigations of large gas blowouts near bovanenkovo field on Yamal peninsula" (PDF). Arctic: Ecology and Economy. 3 (27): 4–17. doi:10.25283/2223-4594-2017-3-4-17.
- Правовые и экономические проблемы освоения природных ресурсов Арктического шельфа [Электронный ресурс]. – Режим доступа: http://www.rg.ru/oficial/from_min/gd_99/465.htm) (13)
- "Лесное Экологическое Моделирование: Текущее Состояние И Перспективы. Откуда Могут Появиться Новые Идеи?". Сибирский лесной журнал (3). 2015. doi:10.15372/sjfs20150301. ISSN 2311-1410.
- Kozlovsky, E. A. (2015-07-31). "Natural resources in the economy of Russia and in the world". Gornyi Zhurnal: 47–53. doi:10.17580/gzh.2015.07.07. ISSN 0017-2278.
- "Лубсанова Н.Б. Совершенствование механизма государственного регулирования локального рынка жилья на основе оптимизации распределения бюджетных ресурсов". Теоретическая и прикладная экономика. 3 (3): 35–42. 2019. doi:10.25136/2409-8647.2019.3.28281. ISSN 2409-8647.
- Lalomov, Alexander V.; Bochneva, Anna A. (2018-11-12). "Rare-metal potential of placer deposits and weathering crusts of the Russian Arctic". Arctic: Ecology and Economy. 4 (32): 111–122. doi:10.25283/2223-4594-2018-4-111-122. ISSN 2223-4594.
