= Shift settlement =

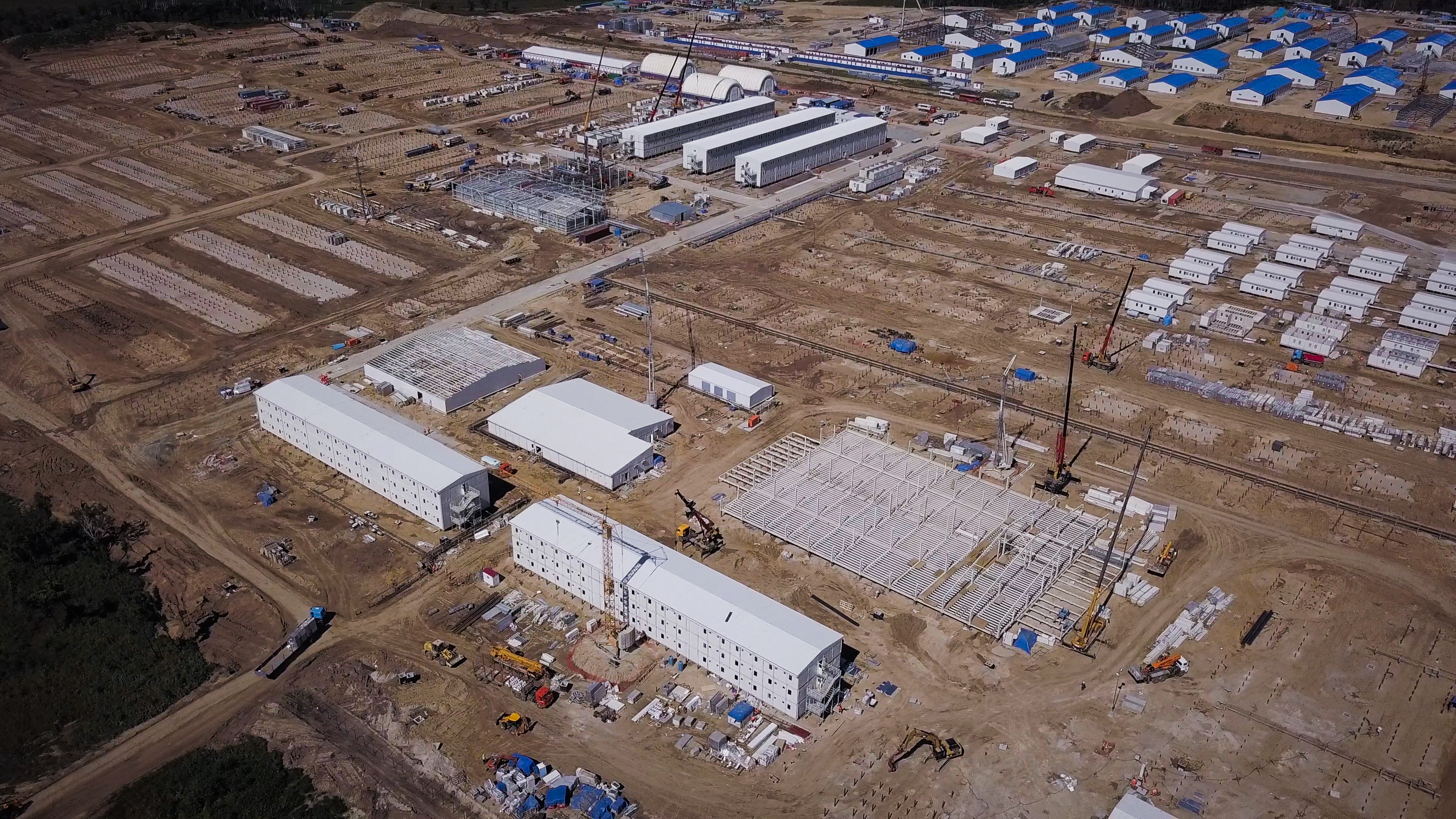
Construction of a shift settlement for the Amur gas processing plant

A shift settlement, shift town, etc. (вахтовый посёлок, вахтовый городок) is the category of urban-type inhabited localities in Russia (and in some other post-Soviet states, e.g., Ukraine), originated in the Soviet Union for short-term accommodation of workers who work in shifts ("fly-in fly-out") at sites in remote areas, e.g., for mining, fishing, road construction, etc. They are also used for the maintenance of vehicles and fuel storage. They differ from another type of settlements, "workers' settlement", in that the latter ones are for permanent residence. Over time, shift settlements may be abandoned (when the mineral resource is exhausted, construction works finished, etc.) or converted into worker's settlements.

According to the Labor Code of Russia, shift settlements must have all amenities present it regular settlements: electricity, water and heat supply, post office, medical and recreational facilities, etc.

Housing in these settlement may be (semi)-permanent or temporary: portable cabins, construction trailers, KUNGs, etc.

As of 2020, the legal status of shift settlements has been undetermined, which creates issues, e.g., during major emergencies.

Major, modernized, shift settlements include Bovanenkovo by the Bovanenkovo gas field, Sabetta, Novozapolyarny (Yamal), Купол, Первомайский (Chukotka) and Varandey (Nenets Autonomous Okrug).

== See also ==
- ru:Категория:Вахтовые посёлки
