= Migrant workers in Russia =

Foreign migrant workers in Russia, commonly referred to as gastarbeiters (Russian: гастарбайтеры, romanized: gastarbaytery), form a significant part of Russia's workforce since the dissolution of the Soviet Union. The labor migrants make up 10% of the labor force in Russia, the significant number of them being illegal immigrants. The majority of recent immigrants to Russia come from former Soviet republics, especially Tajikistan, Kyrgyzstan, Ukraine, Armenia, Kazakhstan and Uzbekistan. As of 2020, according to the UN, Russia ranks 4th in the world in terms of the number of international migrants in absolute numbers (11.58 million people, or 7.9% of the population), after the United States (43.43 million people, or 13.1% of the population), Germany (14.22 million people, or 17.0% of the population), and Saudi Arabia (13.00 million people, or 37.3% of the population).

== Internal migrants ==
In Russian Empire, in poorer agricultural areas the peasants, usually men, were forced to temporarily migrate away from their place of residence for supplemental income, not necessarily seasonal. This custom was called otkhodnichestvo. In some governorates otkhodniks constituted up to 40% of adult male population.

In modern Russia a considerable part of workforce in severe regions of Russian Far North are fly-in fly-out workers. They work in longer shifts and live in shift settlements during work shifts. These workers are usually not called migrants.

== Foreign migrants ==
=== History ===
The Soviet Union began to employ foreign migrant labourers in the early 1970s, primarily taking in workers from Vietnam. By 1983, numbers had reached as many as 365,000, equal to 0.25% of the total workforce at the time. Migrant labourers were both a means of doing work that Soviet workers were unwilling to do as well as assisting economic relations between the Soviet Union and other communist states, with remittances paying off import costs and debt owed to the Soviet Union. In spite of this, the United States Central Intelligence Agency noted that migrant labour failed to resolve the Soviet Union's general labour shortage.

Following the dissolution of the Soviet Union in 1991, economic and living conditions largely declined throughout the countries of the former Soviet Union. As among the least-affected, Russia began to take in large amounts of migrant labourers from fellow ex-Soviet states in the early 1990s, with President Boris Yeltsin signing a decree to prevent their exploitation. At that time, migrant workers were largely from Ukraine and Belarus. From 1995 to 2000 more than half of all migrant labourers came from outside the former Soviet Union, primarily from China, Turkey, and former Yugoslavia.

Numbers of Central Asian and Transcaucasian migrants remained low until the late 1990s, and, as the Russian economy continued to improve in the early 2000s, increased labour demanded resulted in a newfound rise in labour migration, primarily from post-Soviet Central Asia and the South Caucasus. By 2010, Russia had become the second-largest recipient of migrant labour of any country in the world, behind only the United States.

Estimates of the percentage of migrant labourers within the workforce vary significantly. Some estimates go as low as 8%, while others reach as high as 25%.

The Russian invasion of Ukraine has resulted in a significant exodus of migrant workers from Russia to their home countries, owing to international sanctions imposed in response to the invasion. This has resulted in negative repercussions on remittance-dependent economies as a result of Russian economic decline, and, coupled with low unemployment, resulted in a shortage of between 3.6 and 4.8 million labourers in 2023. There have also been several instances of migrant labourers being conscripted to serve in the Russian Armed Forces, and workers have been among the main targets of Russian conscription campaigns in spite of Central Asian governments warning their citizens that they would be subject to criminal prosecution if they participated in the war. During these campaigns, Russian authorities reportedly targeted migrant workers, particularly those from Central Asia, through systematic raids on dormitories and workplaces. Detained individuals were subsequently pressured to sign military contracts under threats of deportation or criminal prosecution. According to the Institute for the Study of War, at least 20,000 Central Asian migrants had been coerced into military service by August 2025. Russian lawmaker Pyotr Tolstoy also proposed a tax on remittances and a ban on migrant labourers from serving in certain jobs, in what sparked backlash from Uzbek lawmakers.

=== Conditions ===
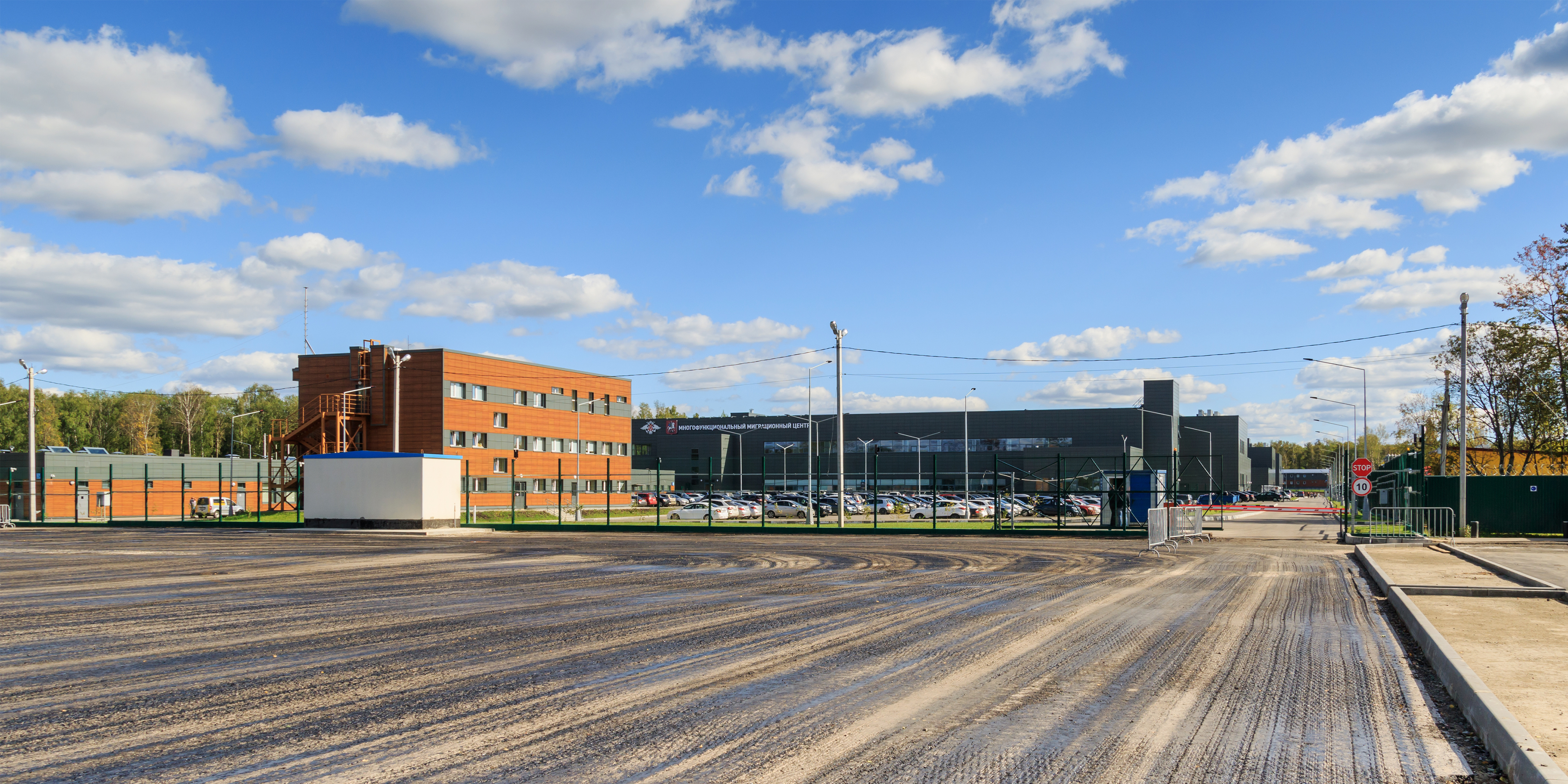
A migrant labourer centre in Troitsky Administrative Okrug, Moscow

Conditions for migrant labourers have been described as poor by news reports and human rights organisations alike, with Human Rights Watch saying that "large numbers of these workers are subjected to abuse and exploitation by employers, employment agencies, and other intermediaries, and are victims of extortion and abuse by police and other officials." Migrant workers have few protections and are often left uninformed of their rights. As a result of scarce information in countries of origin, human trafficking and forced labour of migrants is common, and employers have been reported on some occasions as withholding labourers' passports to prevent them from leaving.

Female migrant labourers have faced particular issues, including lower levels of employment and earnings compared to both male migrant workers and Russian female workers. According to a 1998 study, monthly wages were 30% lower than local women and worked fewer hours than local women. As a result of these differences, it would take a female migrant labourer between 14 and 17 years to reach parity with local women. Assimilation of women into the labour market has also been slow compared to their male counterparts.

=== Economic impact ===
Migrant labourers significantly impact the economy of both Russia and their countries of origin; remittances form large parts of the gross domestic product of Armenia, Kyrgyzstan, and Tajikistan, while adding 386 billion rubles to the Russian state budget between 2015 and 2021. According to Vladimir Volokh, a professor at the State University of Management, migrant labour forms as much as 7-8% of Russia's annual GDP. Countries of origin are even more significantly impacted; the National Bank of Kyrgyzstan reported in 2021 that $2.75 billion, more than a quarter of the country's GDP, came from remittances.

=== In politics ===
During the 1990s Russian state policy towards migrant labourers was largely conciliatory, with laws being passed in 1994 and 1995 to allow simplified citizenship procedures for migrants from the former Soviet Union. Since 2000, however, laws have increasingly restricted criteria for citizenship along ethnic lines, and politicians and Russian media have engaged in nativist rhetoric against migrant labourers. Russia has used migrant labourers as a political tool, such as during the 2006 deportation of Georgians from Russia, when Georgian migrant workers (whose remittances made up at least 15% of the Georgian economy in the first half of 2006) were deported from Russia and sent back to Georgia during the 2006 Georgian–Russian espionage controversy, in a move condemned by Human Rights Watch.

Russian officials have claimed the existence of links between labour migration and Jihadist groups, with director of the Federal Security Service Alexander Bortnikov saying that there were terrorist groups among migrant labourers following the 2017 Saint Petersburg Metro bombing. Migrant workers have also been arrested on occasion and accused of association with Hizb ut-Tahrir, an Islamic fundamentalist group which is banned in Russia.

=== Societal attitudes ===
Societal attitudes towards migrant workers in Russia are largely negative. According to 2021 polling by the Levada Center, 68% of Russians believe that the government should take measures to reduce migrant labour, with another 11% favouring measures to increase migrant labour. This is a decrease from 2020 polling, where 73% of individuals supported reducing migrant labour. 50% (Note: 15% "definitely yes", 35% "probably yes".) of those polled by the Levada Center believe that work done by migrant labourers is good for Russia and society, while 45% (Note: 26% "probably no", 19% "definitely no".) believe it is negative.

Violent crimes and homicides against migrant labourers are widespread, particularly in southern Russia and by neo-Nazis. In a 2008 report by NPR, labourers reported working as "slaves" and were described by the report as forming a "segregated, second class of residents". The Russian government has cast blame for the crimes on illegal immigration, with one proposal from the Moscow municipal government arguing in favour of building separate living quarters for migrants.
