= 71st meridian east =

Line of longitude

71st meridian east

The meridian 71° east of Greenwich is a line of longitude that extends from the North Pole across the Arctic Ocean, Asia, the Indian Ocean, the Southern Ocean, and Antarctica to the South Pole.

The 71st meridian east forms a great circle with the 109th meridian west.

== From Pole to Pole ==
Starting at the North Pole and heading south to the South Pole, the 71st meridian east passes through:

Co-ordinates	Country, territory or sea	Notes
90°0′N 71°0′E	Arctic Ocean	
81°5′N 71°0′E	Kara Sea	
73°29′N 71°0′E	Russia	Bely Island
73°6′N 71°0′E	Malygina Strait	
72°53′N 71°0′E	Russia	Yamal Peninsula
66°32′N 71°0′E	Gulf of Ob	
66°21′N 71°0′E	Russia	
55°5′N 71°0′E	Kazakhstan	
42°30′N 71°0′E	Kyrgyzstan	
42°16′N 71°0′E	Uzbekistan	
42°3′N 71°0′E	Kyrgyzstan	
41°11′N 71°0′E	Uzbekistan	Passing just east of Kokand
40°16′N 71°0′E	Kyrgyzstan	
39°24′N 71°0′E	Tajikistan	
38°28′N 71°0′E	Afghanistan	
34°34′N 71°0′E	Pakistan	Khyber Pakhtunkhwa - for about 9 km
34°29′N 71°0′E	Afghanistan	
34°2′N 71°0′E	Pakistan	Khyber Pakhtunkhwa; Punjab
27°45′N 71°0′E	India	Rajasthan
24°50′N 71°0′E	Pakistan	Sindh
24°37′N 71°0′E	India	Gujarat
24°27′N 71°0′E	Pakistan	Sindh - for about 10 km
24°21′N 71°0′E	India	Gujarat; Dadra and Nagar Haveli and Daman and Diu - for about 1 km
20°44′N 71°0′E	Indian Ocean	Passing just west of Danger Island, British Indian Ocean Territory; Passing just east of Grande Terre, French Southern and Antarctic Lands
60°0′S 71°0′E	Southern Ocean	
68°37′S 71°0′E	Antarctica	Australian Antarctic Territory, claimed by Australia

== See also ==
- 70th meridian east
- 72nd meridian east
