= 70th meridian east =

Line of longitude

70th meridian east

The meridian 70° east of Greenwich is a line of longitude that extends from the North Pole across the Arctic Ocean, Asia, the Indian Ocean, the Southern Ocean, and Antarctica to the South Pole.

The 70th meridian east forms a great circle with the 110th meridian west.

During World War II, the 70th meridian was proposed as a dividing line for Asia between the spheres of interest of Nazi Germany, the Empire of Japan, and Fascist Italy (see Axis powers negotiations on the division of Asia).

== From Pole to Pole ==
Starting at the North Pole and heading south to the South Pole, the 70th meridian east passes through:

| Co-ordinates | Country, territory or sea | Notes |
|---|---|---|
| 90°0′N 70°0′E | Arctic Ocean | |
| 81°0′N 70°0′E | Kara Sea | |
| 73°11′N 70°0′E | Russia | Bely Island |
| 73°0′N 70°0′E | Malygina Strait | |
| 72°52′N 70°0′E | Russia | |
| 55°11′N 70°0′E | Kazakhstan | |
| 41°47′N 70°0′E | Uzbekistan | |
| 40°44′N 70°0′E | Tajikistan | |
| 40°14′N 70°0′E | Kyrgyzstan | |
| 39°32′N 70°0′E | Tajikistan | |
| 37°33′N 70°0′E | Afghanistan | |
| 34°3′N 70°0′E | Pakistan | Khyber Pakhtunkhwa |
| 33°44′N 70°0′E | Afghanistan | |
| 33°8′N 70°0′E | Pakistan | Khyber Pakhtunkhwa; Balochistan; Punjab; Balochistan - for about 10 km Punjab; Sindh |
| 27°32′N 70°0′E | India | Rajasthan |
| 26°35′N 70°0′E | Pakistan | Sindh |
| 24°10′N 70°0′E | India | Gujarat |
| 22°54′N 70°0′E | Indian Ocean | Gulf of Kutch |
| 22°35′N 70°0′E | India | Gujarat - passing through Jamnagar |
| 21°12′N 70°0′E | Indian Ocean | |
| 49°9′S 70°0′E | French Southern and Antarctic Lands | Kerguelen Islands |
| 49°43′S 70°0′E | Indian Ocean | |
| 60°0′S 70°0′E | Southern Ocean | |
| 68°15′S 70°0′E | Antarctica | Australian Antarctic Territory, claimed by Australia |

== See also ==
- 69th meridian east
- 71st meridian east
