= 71st meridian =

71st meridian may refer to:

- 71st meridian east, a line of longitude east of the Greenwich Meridian
- 71st meridian west, a line of longitude west of the Greenwich Meridian

71st meridian west	71st meridian east
