= Yamal (disambiguation) =

Lamine Yamal (born 2007) is a Spanish footballer.

Yamal may also refer to:

- Yamal Peninsula, Siberia
- Yamal Airlines, based in Salekhard, Russia
- Yamal (icebreaker), a Russian icebreaker
- Yamal (satellite constellation), by Gazprom Space Systems
- Yamal project, a natural gas project in the Yamal Peninsula
- Yamal–Europe pipeline
- Yamal LNG
- Russian landing ship Yamal, a Russian warship (1988–2024)

== See also ==
- Yamalo-Nenets Autonomous Okrug, a district in Tyumen Oblast, Western Siberia, Russia
- Yamalsky District, Tyumen Oblast, Western Siberia, Russia
- Princesa Yamal, Argentine vedette
