= Iron Bridge Airport =

- IATA: IBM; ICAO: YIBO

Summary
- Airport type: Private
- Owner: Fortescue Metals Group
- Serves: Iron Bridge Mine, Marble Bar
- Location: Pilbara, Western Australia
- Elevation AMSL: 203 m / 666 ft
- Coordinates: 21°17′24″S 118°52′54″E

Map
- Location of Iron Bridge Airport in Western Australia

Runways
Direction	Length		Surface
Direction	m	ft	Surface
12/30	2,539	8,330	Asphalt
- Sources: * "Iron Bridge Airport (IBM/YIBO)". Flightradar24. Retrieved 30 June 2025. * "YIBO/Japal Camp/Iron Bridge Mine General Airport Information". AC-U-KWIK.

Iron Bridge Airport (IATA: IBM, ICAO: YIBO) is a private aerodrome serving the Iron Bridge Mine near Marble Bar in the Pilbara region of Western Australia. The airport handles fly-in fly-out charter flights for mine personnel. It might typically see 2 flights a day.
