= Igor Nak =

Russian politician (born 1963)

Igor Vladimirovich Nak
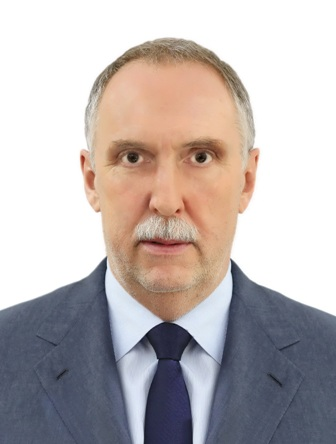
- Born: 6 August 1963 (age 63); Moscow, USSR
- Spouse: Elena Nak
- Children: Vladimir Nak (born 1985); Grigoriy Nak (born 1990)
- Parent(s): Irina Alexandrovna Kuznetsova (born 1938); Vladimir Nak (1935–2010)
- Awards: Russian Federation Presidential Certificate of Honour

Igor Vladimirovich Nak (Russian: Игорь Владимирович Нак; born 6 August 1963, Moscow, Soviet Union) is a Russian government and political figure, head of the United Russia faction in the State Duma for the Yamalo-Nenets Autonomous Okrug, head of the Council of the Deputy Faction, Chairman of the Coordinating Committee of the Russian Union of Industrialists and Entrepreneurs in the Ural Federal District, deputy of the Tyumen Regional Duma for the single electoral district from the United Russia political party, entrepreneur, general director of Yamaltransstroy JSC, Kandidat of Technical Sciences, and Honorary Transport Engineer of Russia.

== Biography ==
Born on 6 August 1963 in the city of Moscow. In 1985, he graduated from the Institute of Railway Transport of the Moscow Order of Lenin and Order of the Red Banner of Labour, specializing in "Construction of Railways, Tracks and Track Facilities". In 2004, he defended his dissertation and received the academic degree of candidate of technical sciences. From 1985, he worked as expert and works manufacturer in construction and installation train No. 643 of the Moselectrotyagstroy trust. From 1986, he worked as works manufacturer, Deputy Head and Head in construction and installation train No. 351 of Yamaltransstroy manufacturing construction and installation union (Labytnangi city). Since 1997, he was First Deputy then General Director of Yamaltransstroy JSC, one of Russia's largest companies for railway construction above the Arctic Circle on the Yamal Peninsula.

== Political activities ==
1990–1994 – elected deputy of the City Council of People's Deputies of Labytnangi city.

1994–1997 – deputy of the city Duma.

1996–1997 – deputy of the State Duma of the Yamalo-Nenets Autonomous Okrug.

2000–2007 – headed the Political Council of the Yamalo-Nenetsky regional branch of the Russian political party United Russia in the State Duma of the Autonomous Okrug, Head of the Council of the Deputy Faction.

Since 2007 head of the Yamalo-Nenetsky branch of the Russian Union of Industrialists and Entrepreneurs/RSPP, Member of the Board of RSPP. In the same year, he was elected deputy of the Tyumen Oblast Duma for the single electoral district by the political party United Russia.

Since 2009 chairman of the Presidium of the Coordinating Council of Associations of RSPP for the Ural Federal District.

== Honours and awards ==
Medal of the Order for Services to the Fatherland of 1st level (22 October 2011) for achieving successes in work and many years of productive work.

Medal of the Order for Services to the Fatherland of the 2nd level (9 March 1996).

Honorary Charter of the President of the Russian Federation (14 August 2013) for achieving successes in work, active community undertakings and many years of conscientious work.

Badge of Honorary Transport Engineer (16 August 1994) for a large contribution to the social and economic development of the Yamalo-Nenetsky Autonomous Okrug and in connection with the 65th anniversary of its foundation.

Badge of Honorary Transport Engineer (6 August 2008) for many years of productive work and large contribution to the development of transport construction.

Russian Orthodox Church's Order of the Venerable Sergei of Radonezh of the 3rd level (19 June 2007) for providing assistance to Tobolsk Theological Schools.

Honorary Charter of the State Duma of the Yamalo-Nenetrsky Autonomous Okrug (26 September 2003) for achievements in the area of transport construction on the Yamal Peninsula and high quality of executed work (Ministry of Construction of the Russian Federation).

Honorary Charter of the Chairman of the Federal Council of the Federal Assembly of the Russian Federation (6 December 2005) for conscientious work, large contribution to the development of legislation of the Yamalo-Nenetsky Okrug, strengthening of democracy, and also in connection with the 75th anniversary of the foundation of the Yamalo-Nenetsky Autonomous Okrug.

Honorary Charter of the Tyumen Oblast Duma (20 December 2007) for many years of conscientious work and significant contribution to the socio-economic development of Tyumen Oblast.

Honorary Charter (7 May 2007) for productive and effective work in the post of Secretary of the Political Council of the Yamalo-Nenetsky branch of the United Russia political party.

Honorary Charter of the Governor of Tyumen Oblast (7 April 2009) for significant contribution to the development of legislation of Tyumen Oblast, many years of conscientious work and in connection with the 15th anniversary of the foundation of the Tyumen Oblast Duma.

Honorary Charter (10 December 2010) for many years of conscientious work, large contribution to the socio-economic development of the Yamalo-Nenetsky Autonomous Okrug, and in connection with the 25th anniversary of the foundation of Yamaltransstroy JSC (Ruling of the Legislative Assembly of the Yamalo-Nenetsky Autonomous Okrug).

Honorary Charter (23 December 2010) for significant contribution to the development of legislation of the Russian Federation and parliamentarianism in the Russian Federation (Order of the Chairman of the State Duma).

Honorary Charter of the Ministry of Economic Development of the Russian Federation (12 April 2010) for active participation in the development and implementation of social and economic policy based on public-private partnership.

Badge from the Russian Trade Union of Railwaymen and Transport Engineers "For Development of Social Partnership" (15 June 2010) for a large contribution to the development of transport construction, productive work in defending the socio-economic interests of workers, and strengthening the social partnership with the Russian Trade Union of Railwaymen and Transport Engineers.

Golden Badge of the Moscow Institute of Transport Engineers (31 August 2010).
