= Sabetta =

Sabetta Сабетта
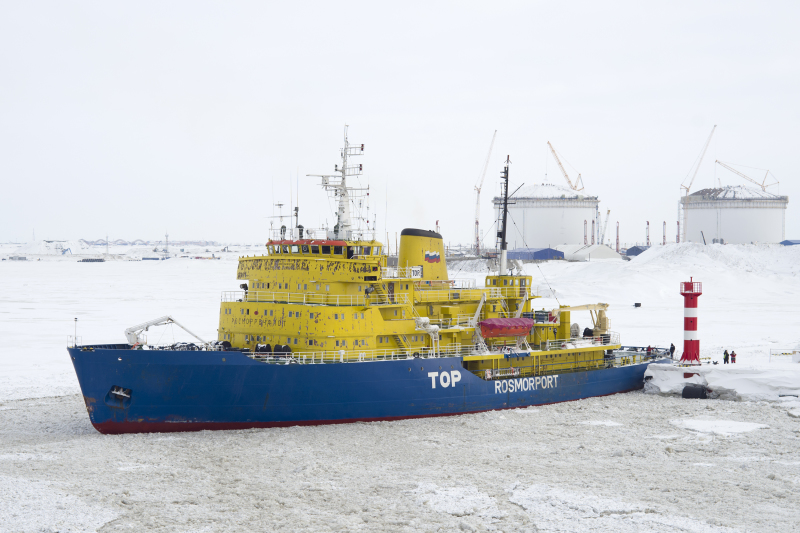
- Russian icebreaker Tor in the ice-covered port of Sabetta
- Interactive map of Sabetta
- Location of Sabetta Sabetta (Yamalo-Nenets Autonomous Okrug)
- Coordinates: 71.2733°N 72.0725°E
- Country: Russia
- Federal subject: Yamalo-Nenets Autonomous Okrug

Sabetta (Russian: Сабетта) is the location of a port and liquified natural gas (LNG) plant—Yamal LNG—on the Yamal Peninsula, in the north of Russia along the Northern Sea Route, as well as a shift settlement for "fly-in fly-out" workers of the plant.

== Location ==
The site chosen for the port is on the western shore of the Ob estuary, on the Yamal peninsula. It is close to, and will serve, the Yuzhno-Tambeyskoye gas field.

== Project ==
The port is a joint venture between Novatek—a large producer of natural gas—and the Russian government. The groundbreaking ceremony was held in July 2012, but construction of the port itself was scheduled to begin in the summer of 2013. The project includes a large LNG plant, capable of producing 16.5 million tons of LNG per year. The port would allow LNG to be exported by sea, year round, from Siberian oil & gas fields. Construction of the LNG plant itself is contracted to JGC and Technip.

A 180 km railway line is planned, connecting Bovanenkovo to Sabetta.

In December 2014, amid the 2014–15 Russian financial crisis, the Russian government gave a 150 billion rouble subsidy to the LNG project.

The port and first phase of the plant were opened by President Putin on 8 December 2017.

According to Novatek on 22 October 2019, the natural gas reserves in the Yamalo-Nenets Autonomous Okrug represent 80% of Russia's natural gas and 15% of the world's natural gas supply.

== Transportation ==
Sabetta International Airport (IATA: SBT, ICAO: USDA) is serving the city.

A $3.22 billion proposal for a railway project connecting Sabetta to the broader Eurasian rail network was approved in March 2017.

== Shipping ==
The port requires extensive dredging of channels; this is being performed by DEME and Jan De Nul. Ice also poses serious challenges to shipping.

DSME is building fifteen LNG carriers for the project.

As well as LNG exports, some goods imports are expected too; the port plan includes at least one berth for customs inspections of foreign ships.

In 2016 Chemical reactors were shipped from South Korea through Sabetta, on its way to the Pavlodar oil refinery.

Barges of grain will travel 2,000 kilometers down the Irtysh, to be transferred to freighters, for shipment to Japan.

=== United States sanctions beginning September 2019 ===
Following the 14 September 2019 attack allegedly by Iran on Saudi Arabian oil fields at Khurais and Abqaiq (Biqayq in Arabic) during the 2019–2021 Persian Gulf crisis, the US imposed sanctions under Executive Order 13846 against several companies including Cosco Shipping Tanker (Dalian) Seaman and Ship Management Company Ltd and the Cosco Shipping Tanker Dalian (大連中遠海運油品運輸有限公司) which are two Cosco Shipping Company subsidiaries that are supporting LNG shipments from Sabetta.

As of late September 2019, the Joint Venture TC LNG between the Canadian firm Teekay and China LNG Shipping Ltd (CLNG) which has more than one third of Sabetta's LNG ice fleet, six ARC7 LNG tankers: Eduard Toll (Russian: «Эдуард Толль»), Rudolf Samoilovich (Russian: «Рудольф Самойлович»), Nikolay Yevgenov (Russian: «Николай Евгенов»), Vladimir Voronin (Russian: «Владимир Воронин») all of which are operating, Georgy Ushakov (Russian: «Георгий Ушаков») which is going to Sabetta after sea trials, and Yakov Gakkel (Russian: «Яков Гаккель») which was at the time under sea trials at a South Korean shipyard. Also affected are five ARC7 tankers which Dynagas will supply in a partnership between Sinotrans&CSC and CLNG (25.5% stake), as well as three ARC7 tankers from a joint venture between the Cosco subsidiary Shanghai LNG and Japan's MOL (株式会社商船三井). However, these former five and later three ARC7 tankers are not directly sanctioned but US Office of Foreign Assets Control (OFAC) rules require caution to be exercised in the former.

Of the fifteen ARC7 tankers operating out of Sabetta, only Sovcomflot's Christophe de Margerie is not affected by the 2019 sanctions. Although these ships have been serviced at Honningsvåg, Norway, this will be phased out and future LNG tanker shipments along the Northern Sea Route may occur between Murmansk and Kamchatka in Russia coastal waters.

On 30 January 2020, the United States lifted sanctions on Cosco Shipping Tanker (Dalian) and its TC LNG.

=== After US sanctions ===
In 2025, Yamal sent out 270 LNG shipments from Sabetta. Of these, 88 went to France, 57 to Belgium and another 50 to China.
