= Vladimir Nak =

Russian engineer (1935–2010)

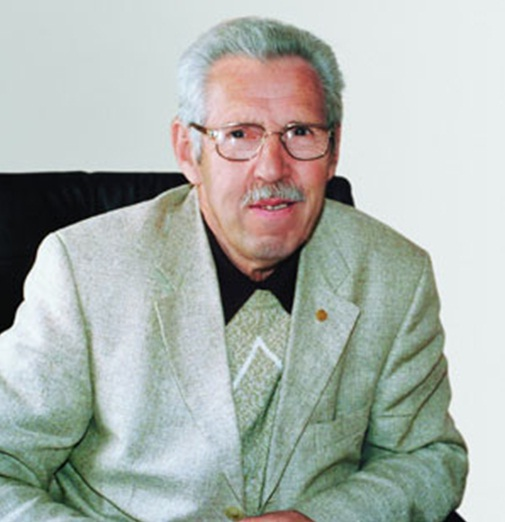
- Born: Vladimir Grigorievich Nak; 5 November 1935; Moscow, RSFSR, USSR
- Died: 16 February 2010 (age 74); Moscow
- Citizenship: USSR, Russia
- Children: Igor Nak (born 1963)
- Awards: Order of the Badge of Honour; Order of Friendship of Peoples

Vladimir Grigorievich Nak (5 November 1935, Tyumen – 16 February 2010, Moscow) was a Russian transport engineer, honorary builder of the RSFSR, and Head of the Production construction and installation union Yamaltransstroy.

Under his direct leadership and participation, construction of a large number of transportation, industrial, residential and socio-cultural facilities was implemented throughout the European part of the USSR

== Biography ==
Born on 5 November 1935 in the city of Moscow. In 1959, he graduated from the Moscow Institute of Transport Engineers. His career path began in the system of the Ministry for Transport Construction of the Soviet of Socialist Republics, a path leading from foreman to Deputy Head of the Main Department for Railway Construction of the North and West.

From 1986: headed the newly established production construction and installation union (PSMO) Yamaltransstroy. From 1992: general director of the joint stock company Yamaltransstroy, which became the successor of the PSMO. 525 km of the 572-kilometre long Obskaya-Bovanenkovo railway was built under his leadership and personal participation.

In 1997, he was elected chairman of the Board of Directors of Yamaltransstroy JSC. Repeatedly elected deputy of Tyumen Oblast and Yamalo-Nenetsky Okrug Council of People's Deputies.

=== Death ===
Died on 16 February 2010 in Moscow.

== Awards and marks of recognition ==
=== Awards ===
- Order of the Badge of Honour
- Order of Peoples' Friendship

=== Titles and recognition ===
- Honorary builder of the RSFSR
- Honorary transport engineer
- Honorary worker of the gas industry
- Honorary resident of Yamalo-Nenetsky Autonomous Okrug

== Family ==
Wife — Irina Alexandrovna Kuznetsova
Son — Igor Nak

== Links ==
- Life path of Vladimir Nak
- Vladimir Nak. Epilogue to Confession
