= Obskaya–Bovanenkovo Line =

Railway line in northern Russia

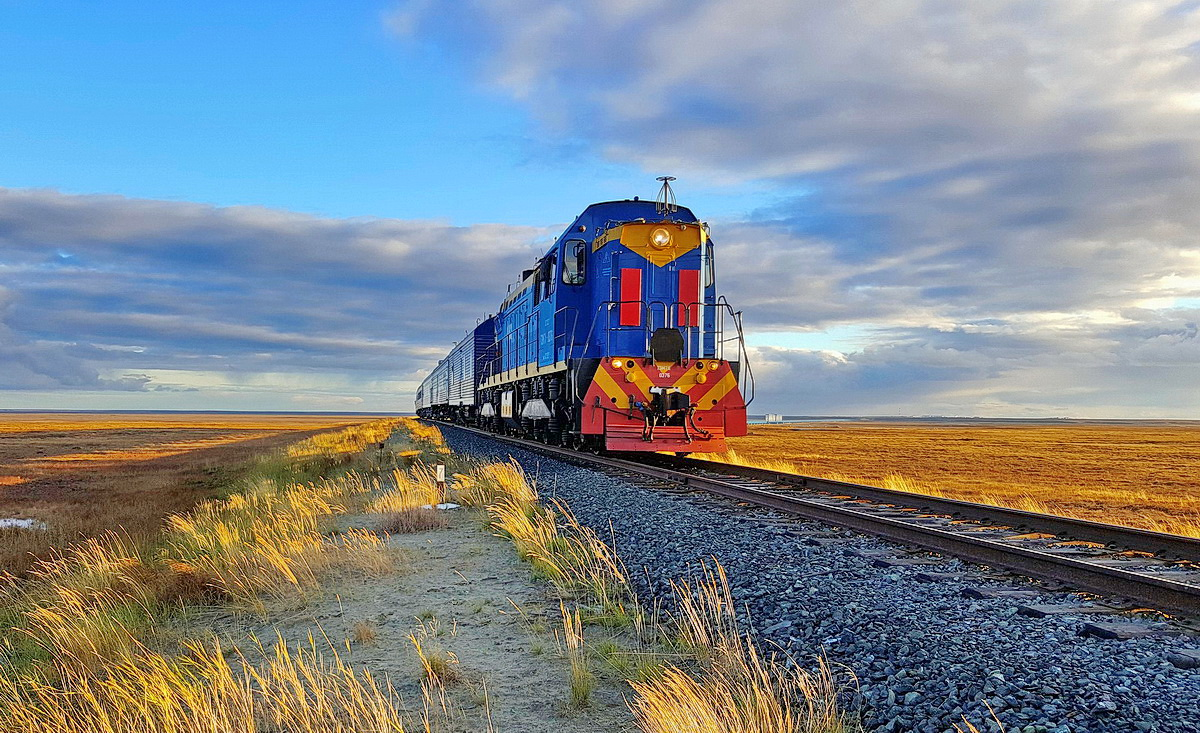
- A train on the Obskaya–Bovanenkovo railway

Overview
- Native name: Железнодорожная линия Обская—Бованенково—Карская
- Status: Operational
- Owner: Gazprom
- Locale: Russia Far North
- Termini: Karskaya; Obskaya
- Continues as: Northern Latitudinal Railway
- Stations: 11

Service
- Type: Freight rail
- Operator(s): Gazprom
- Rolling stock: TE33A

History
- Opened: 12 January 2010

Technical
- Line length: 572 km (355 mi)
- Number of tracks: 1
- Track gauge: 1,520 mm (4 ft 11 27/32 in) Russian gauge

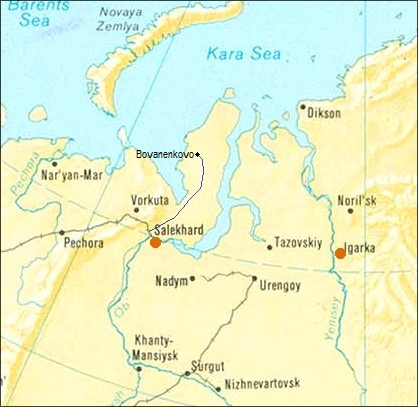
Obskaya–Bovanenkovo Railway line in blue colour

The Obskaya–Bovanenkovo Line is a 572-kilometre-long (355 mi) railway line in northern Russia, built and owned and operated by Gazprom. It was opened for traffic in 2010 and was built for the gas fields around Bovanenkovo on the Yamal Peninsula, the Yamal project. In February 2011, it was extended to the Karskaya station, making it 572 km long. Like most railways in the former Russian Empire, it is built to Russian gauge.

The railway contains a 3.9-kilometre-long (2.4 mi) bridge, the Yuribey Bridge. It starts at Obskaya, branching off the Salekhard–Igarka Railway. The rail distance between Moscow and Bovanenkovo is 2,906 kilometres (1,806 mi).

There are plans to extend the railway to Kharasavey making the railway 678 kilometres (421 mi) long. Another plan is to extend the railway to the Yamal LNG installations at Sabetta.

== Northernmost railway ==
The railway is the northernmost railway in the world, since Bovanenkovo is located at 70°22′30″N 68°40′12″E, farther north than the Kirkenes–Bjørnevatn Line, previously the northernmost. Plans to construct a more northerly railway to serve the Baffinland Iron Mine in Canada was approved for construction in January 2026. Before completion of the railway to Bovanenkovo, the most northerly railway in Russia was the Norilsk railway. Due to all Russian railways being built to gauges other than standard gauge (usually Russian gauge, but a few narrow gauge lines also exist), the lines in Norway can however continue to claim being the northernmost standard gauge railway.
