= Chukchi =

Chukchi may refer to:

- Chukchi people, a people of the Chukotka Peninsula in Siberia, Russia
- Chukchi language, their Paleosiberian language
- Chukchi Peninsula or Chukotka Peninsula, a peninsula in eastern Siberia
- Chukchi Sea, a sea of the Arctic Ocean

== See also ==
- Chukotka (disambiguation)
- Chukotsky (disambiguation)
