= Chukotsky =

Chukotsky (Russian: чуко́тский, [t]chukótskiy, masculine), Chukotskaya (чуко́тская, [t]chukótskaya, feminine), Chukotskoye (чуко́тское, [t]chukótskoye, neuter), or Chukotskiye (чуко́тские, [t]chukótskiye, plural) may refer to:

- Chukotka Autonomous Okrug (Chukotsky avtonomny okrug), a federal subject of Russia
- Chukotsky District (Chukotsky raión), a district of Chukotka Autonomous Okrug, Russia

== See also ==
- Chukchi (disambiguation)
- Chukotka (disambiguation)
