= Yamal project =

Natural gas project in Russia

Coordinates: 70°29′N 68°00′E

The Yamal project, also referred to as the Yamal megaproject, is a long-term plan to exploit and bring to the markets the vast natural gas reserves in the Yamal Peninsula, Russia. Administratively, the project is located in the Yamalo-Nenets Autonomous Okrug.

== History ==
Preparations for the Yamal's development started in the 1990s. According to the original plans, drilling work on the Bovanenkovo field was to have started in 1997. In January 2002, Gazprom identified the Yamal Peninsula as a region of Gazprom's strategic interest. Preparatory works started in 2007 with the construction of auxiliary infrastructures, such as staff buildings and transport facilities. In July 2008 Gazprom launched the construction of the Bovanenkovo–Ukhta gas trunkline at the submerged crossing via the Baydaratskaya Bay. The project was officially inaugurated on 3 December 2008.

As of 2020, Yamal produces about 20% of Russia's natural gas, which is expected to increase to 40% by 2030.

== Oil and gas fields ==
As of 2008, Gazprom listed 11 gas fields and 15 oil, gas and condensate fields on the Yamal Peninsula and the Yamal shelf in the Kara Sea. They consisted of 16 trillion cubic meters (tcm) of explored and provisionally evaluated gas reserves, and nearly 22 tcm of in-place and forecast gas reserves. Estimated condensate reserves were 230.7 million tonnes; estimated oil reserves were 291.8 million tonnes. The largest gas fields for which Gazprom owns the licenses were the Bovanenkovo, Kharasavey, Novoportovo, Kruzenshtern, Severo-Tambey, Zapadno-Tambey, Tasiy and Malygin fields.

As of 2021, Gazprom listed 18 fields it has licenses for in the Yamal Peninsula and offshore, only a few of which were in production. Evaluated reserves for these fields were given as 20.4 trillion cubic meters (tcm) of gas and 1 billion tonnes of gas condensate and oil. In 2020 99.25 billion cubic meters (bcm) of gas was produced.

=== Bovanenkovo gas field ===
The Bovanenkovo gas field is the largest gas field on the Yamal Peninsula with estimated reserves of 4.9 tcm. In 2020 production was 99 billion cubic metres (3.5×10^{12} cu ft), of its nominal production capacity of 115 billion cubic metres (4.1×10^{12} cu ft) per year.

=== Yamal LNG ===
In November 2008, Gazprom announced that it had a list of potential partners for the Yamal LNG project. Ultimately however Novatek was the principal shareholder, and commercial operation started in December 2017 with the loading of the first LNG carrier.

== Transport ==
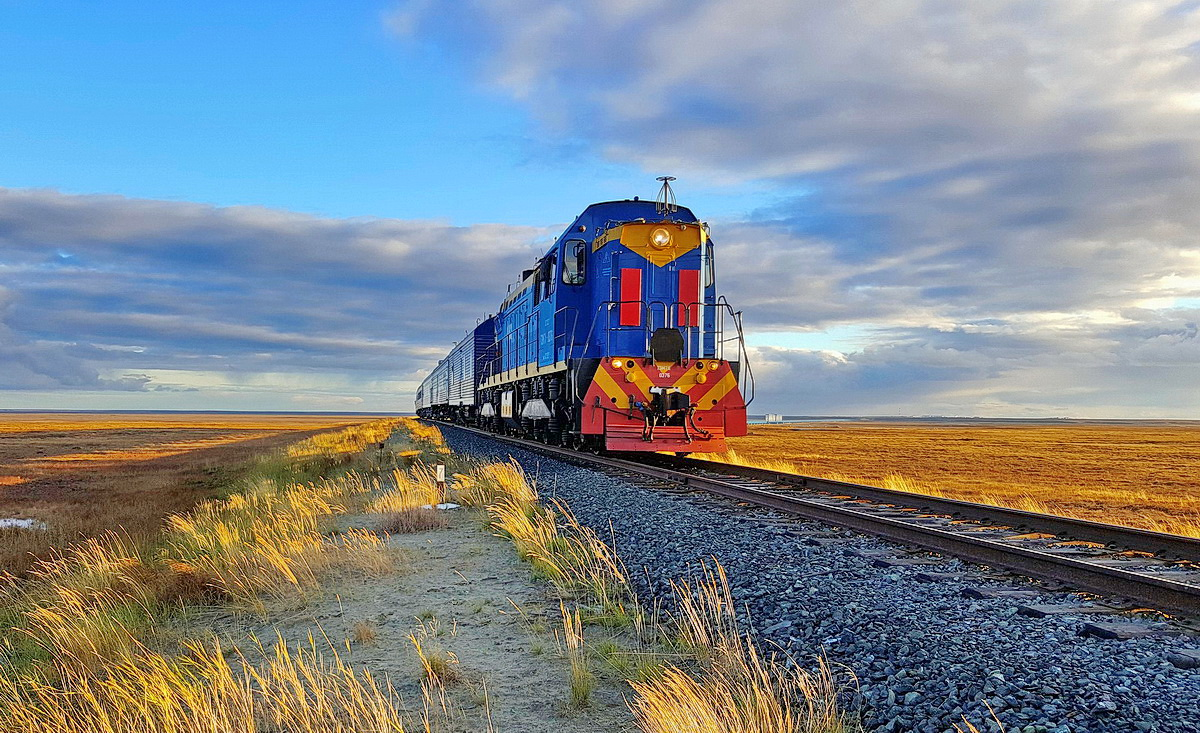
A train on the Obskaya–Bovanenkovo railway

The 572 kilometres (355 mi) Obskaya–Bovanenkovo railway was opened in 2011 to provide all year access to the Bovanenkovo gas field. The port at Kharasavey gas field can be used in the summer. The gas fields are also served by the Bovanenkovo Airport (IATA: BVJ).

The Arctic Gate offshore oil loading terminal is located in the Gulf of Ob, designed to operate where ice could be over two meters thick.

== Trunk pipelines ==
A joint project (Yamal-Europe pipeline) between gas transportation companies of Russia, Belarus, Poland and Germany was agreed in 1993 and commissioned in 1999. After commissioning of the Bovanenkovo–Ukhta gas trunkline it will deliver Yamal's gas to Europe. Construction of this pipeline started in July 2008 and was officially launched on 3 December 2008. The 1,100-kilometre (680 mi) gas pipeline is to connect the Bovanenkovo gas field with the Russian gas hub at Ukhta. First deliveries of over 15 bcm per year were originally expected to start by the end of 2011, but actual pipeline filling with natural gas started on 15 June 2012.

The shortest pipeline routes from Yamal to the northern EU countries are the Yamal–Europe pipeline through Poland and Nord Stream 1 to Germany. The proposed gas route from Western Siberia to China is known as Power of Siberia 2 pipeline.

== See also ==
- West Siberian petroleum basin
