= Neito =

Lake in Yamalo-Nenets Autonomous Okrug, Russia

- Нейто
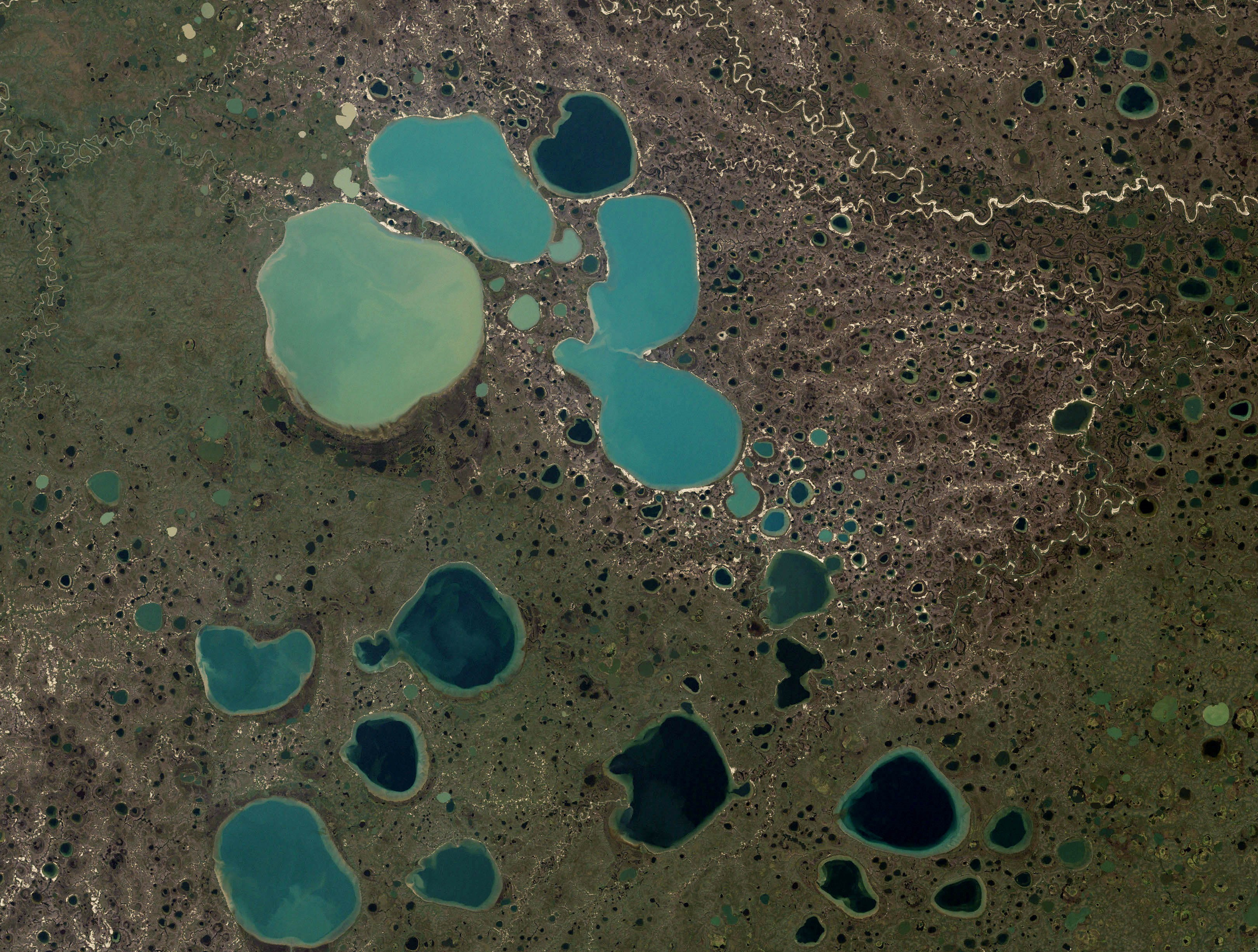
- Neito lakes NASA image, with lake Yambuto on the right

- Location in the Yamalo-Nenets Autonomous Okrug, Russia
- Location: Yamal Peninsula
- Coordinates: 70°04′N 70°25′E
- Lake type: Thaw lakes
- Primary outflows: Syoyakha
- Basin countries: Russia
- Surface area: 380 square kilometres (150 mi^{2})
- Max. depth: 52 m (171 ft)
- Islands: None

Neito (Russian: Нейто) is a freshwater lake group in Yamalo-Nenets Autonomous Okrug, Russia.

The water in the lakes is cleaner than in Lake Baikal. Neito is a traditional sacred site for the Nenets, the indigenous people of the region.

== Geography ==
Neito is a cluster of three lakes totaling a surface area of 380 square kilometres (150 mi^{2}). Lake Yambuto lies very close to the southeast. The Neito group is located north of the Arctic Circle, in the central part of the Yamal Peninsula, in an area of smaller lakes of thermokarst origin.

The three lakes are roughly aligned in a NNE / SSW direction. The southern lake is the largest one, with a length of 16 kilometres (9.9 mi) and an area of 215 square kilometres (83 mi^{2}). The Syoyakha (Сёяха) river flows westwards from the northwestern end of its shores. The middle one has an area of 116 square kilometres (45 mi^{2}) and is separated from the southern lake by a narrow spit. Neito 1st (Нейто 1-ое), the northernmost one, is the smallest, with an area of 48.8 square kilometres (18.8 mi^{2}).

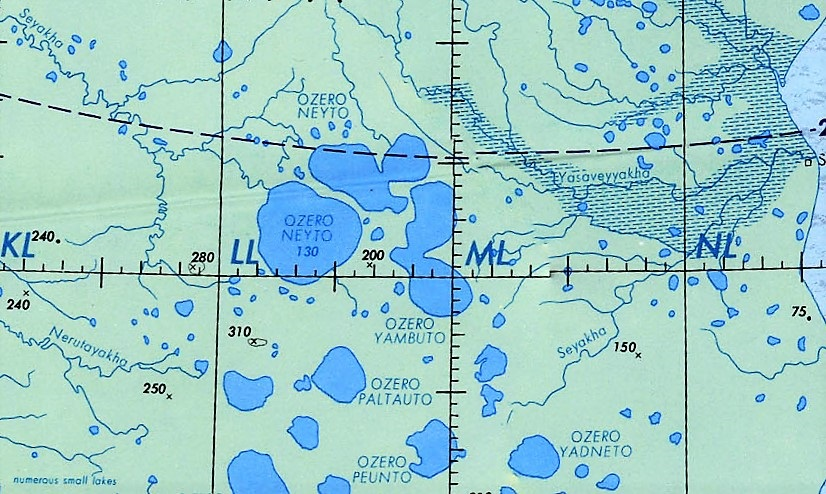
Neito lakes ONC map section.

== See also ==
- List of lakes of Russia
