= Yuribey Bridge =

Railway bridge in Yamalia, Russia

Bridge over Yuribey Мост через Юрибей
- Coordinates: 68.923333°N 70.309722°E
- Carries: Obskaya–Bovanenkovo Line
- Crosses: Yuribey River
- Locale: Yamalo-Nenets Autonomous Okrug

Characteristics
- Design: Railroad bridge
- Total length: 3892.9 metres
- Width: 25 metres each bridge
- Longest span: 150 metres
- No. of spans: 2

History
- Opened: 2009

The Yuribey Bridge (Russian: мост через Юрибей) is a 3.9-kilometre-long (2.4 mi) railway bridge on the Obskaya–Bovanenkovo Line. It has two main spans of 150 metres (490 ft). The bridge was completed in 2009. It is the longest bridge above the Arctic Circle.

The bridge was constructed by Gazprom in a harsh environment including the need to build on permafrost, which required an innovative approach to the construction technique and bridge design. The bridge has to be much longer than the river width, because on permafrost, the water from melting snow does not sink into the ground, so the spring flows get quite strong.

== Construction ==
In accordance with information provided by the media, the construction of the bridge was successfully accomplished within a brief timeframe of 349 days, an impressive feat considering the complexity and magnitude of such structural endeavors. The completion of this project was marked in the month of April in the year 2009, and on the momentous date of June 4, 2009, the bridge witnessed its inaugural passage of esteemed individuals, including the distinguished presidential envoy in the Urals Federal District, Nikolai Vinnichenko, the esteemed Governor of Yamal, Jury Neyolov, as well as the accomplished CEO of Gazpromtrans, Vyacheslav Tyurin.

The completion of the bridge was a crucial step in the construction of the railway to the Bovanenkovo and marked the beginning of development at the Bovanenkovo oil and gas condensate field. The bridge itself is made up of 107 standard spans, each measuring 34.2 meters in length, along with 2 through trusses that are 110 meters long. These spans and trusses are supported by 110 bridge arms, which are constructed using metal pipes ranging from 1.2 to 2.4 meters in diameter and filled with reinforced concrete. In order to ensure the stability of the pillars in the permafrost, holes were drilled to depths of 20 to 40 meters. The total weight of the bridge exceeds 30,000 tons and it is designed to have a service life of 100 years.

Records
Preceded by ?	Russia’s longest railway bridge 2009 – 2019	Succeeded by Crimean Bridge
