= Karskaya railway station =

Railway station in Russia, world's furthest north

Coordinates: 70°18′59.6″N 68°23′34.5″E

Karskaya Карская

General information
- Location: Karskaya; Russia
- Line: Obskaya–Bovanenkovo Line extension

History
- Opened: February 2011
Location

Karskaya railway station, at the end of the extension of the Obskaya–Bovanenkovo Line, in Russia, is the most northerly railway station in the world.

The line to Karskaya, a town inside the Arctic Circle known for natural gas extraction, was completed by Gasprom in February 2011.
