= 2006 deportation of Georgians from Russia =

Mass deportation of ethnic Georgians in Russia

The 2006 deportation of Georgians from Russia refers to the deaths, unlawful arrests, expulsions and overall mistreatment of several thousand ethnic Georgians by the Russian government during the 2006 Georgian–Russian espionage controversy. The official Russian position was that Georgians in question violated the Russian immigration law and that their expulsion and treatment in custody was just standard law enforcement. The Georgian government countered that Russia's concerted actions against ethnic Georgians, including properly documented individuals, was an act of political retribution for the arrest of Russian spies and was tantamount to "mild form of ethnic cleansing". Georgian claims were supported by the Human Rights Watch, which documented "the Russian government's arbitrary and illegal detention and expulsion of Georgians, including many who legally lived and worked in Russia..." Georgia subsequently sued the Russian Government in the European Court of Human Rights (ECHR).

Russian human rights defenders widely criticized the move. Human Rights Center "Memorial" demanded to immediately stop the campaign against people born in Georgia. Radio "Echo of Moscow" started a campaign "I am a Georgian", calling for Russian citizens to wear a badge with such a sign in solidarity.

In 2014, the European Court ruled in Georgia's favor, concluding that Russia's actions in 2006 violated the European Convention on Human Rights. The ruling gave the Russian government a period of 12 months so that it could negotiate with Georgia the precise terms of compensation for damages incurred by the Georgian citizens and their families; in 2015 Georgia officially requested in excess of €70 million in damages for the victims. In 2019, the European Court awarded Georgia with 10 million Euro damages compensation.

== Deaths and allegations of mistreatment ==
The spree of arrests and deportations of ethnic Georgians in Russia was marred by allegations of grave human rights violations. Two Georgians died in Moscow while in custody. Tenghiz Togonidze, a 48-year-old migrant worker died of acute asthma in a Moscow airport as he was awaiting deportation. According to the Georgian Embassy in Moscow, Togonidze was denied medical attention for five days of detention despite his requests to see a doctor. The Russian authorities say everything possible was done for Togonidze. Manana Jabelia, a Georgian national living in Russia since the war in Abkhazia, died of a heart attack in Moscow while in custody following her detention for allegedly not having any identity or immigration papers. At the time, her passport was pending renewal at the Georgian consulate in Moscow.

== International reaction ==
On 1 October 2007, the Human Rights Watch released a report on Georgian immigrants in Russia, which documented "the Russian government's arbitrary and illegal detention and expulsion of Georgians, including many who legally lived and worked in Russia," and that following the growing political tensions between Russia and Georgia, "Russian authorities began a widespread crackdown on ethnic Georgians, Georgian nationals, and Georgian-owned or Georgian-themed businesses and organizations... Senior government officials disparaged Georgians openly on government-owned TV, and much of Russia's government-friendly TV and other media followed suit... Police and other authorities denied basic rights to many of the detained" and underscored that "the Russian government's campaign against Georgians occurred in the context of pervasive racism and xenophobia in Russia."

In its January 2007 report, Freedom House concluded that the Russian authorities "tolerated and encouraged the mistreatment of immigrants from Georgia and other Caucasus countries."

== Legal proceedings ==
Georgia sued Russia in the European Court of Human Rights (ECHR), demanding that Moscow reimbursed pecuniary and non-pecuniary damages. On 3 July 2009, the ECHR declared that it found Georgia's complaints against Russia over deportations admissible for hearing and would deliver its judgment "at a later date".

In 2014, the European Court finally ruled that Russia's action's in 2006 were in violation of the European Court of Human Rights and gave Moscow 12 months to negotiate with Georgia the precise terms of compensation for damages incurred by the Georgian citizens; in 2015 Georgia officially requested in excess of €70 million for the victims.

In January 2019, the European Court of Human Rights (ECHR) ruled that as a result of the 2014 verdict, and upon Georgia's 2015 application for damage compensation, Russia has to pay €10 million to Georgia. As of December 2020, Russia has not yet issued compensations to the deportees. On 4 December 2020, the Committee of Ministers of the Council of Europe called on the Russian authorities to "either directly pay the just satisfaction and the interest accrued to the Government of Georgia, or to commit to using the Council of Europe as an intermediary for that payment."
