= Chukotka =

Chukotka may refer to:

- Chukotka Autonomous Okrug, a federal subject of Russia
- Chukotka, alternative name of the Chukchi Peninsula, eastmost peninsula of Asia in the Russian Far East
- Chukotka Mountains
- 2509 Chukotka, an asteroid

== See also ==
- Chukotsky (disambiguation)
- Chukchi (disambiguation)
