= Bely Island =

Island in the Kara Sea, Siberia, Russia

Native name: Белый остров
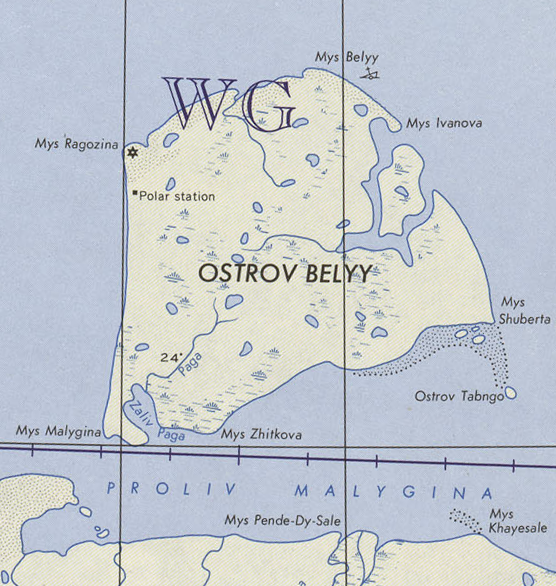
- Bely Island, Kara Sea

- Location within Yamalo-Nenets Autonomous Okrug

Geography
- Location: Kara Sea
- Coordinates: 73°11′N 71°17′E
- Area: 1,810 km^{2} (700 sq mi)
- Length: 63 km (39.1 mi)
- Width: 41 km (25.5 mi)
- Highest elevation: 12 m (39 ft)
- Highest point: None

Administration
- Russia
- Oblast: Tyumen Oblast
- Okrug: Yamalo-Nenets Autonomous Okrug

Bely Island (also spelled as Belyy and Beliy, Russian: Белый остров) is a relatively large island in the Kara Sea off the tip of the Yamal Peninsula, Siberia, Russia. Close to the island's northwest tip, there is the Russian Experiment Station (Polyarnaya Stantsiya) Popov Station.

== Geography ==
Bely Island covers an area of 1,810 square kilometres (700 sq mi). It is covered by tundra, but some lichens, grasses, and dwarf willow shrubs (Salix purpurea) grow during the warmer seasons. It is separated from the mainland by the Malygina Strait, an 8-to-10-km-wide sound which is frozen most of the year. The land is rather flat, going only 12m above sea level, and the island is dotted by small lakes and ponds. Since it is in the Arctic Circle, winters are long and frigid, the average annual temperature is a mere −10.6 °C. In February, temperatures average −24.2 °C reaching a record low of −59 °C. The summers are characterized by fog, with an average temperature of +5.3 °C. The area is subject to polar lows and general cyclonic activity.

This island belongs to the Yamalo-Nenets Autonomous Okrug, which is the northern part of the Tyumen Oblast administrative division of Russia.

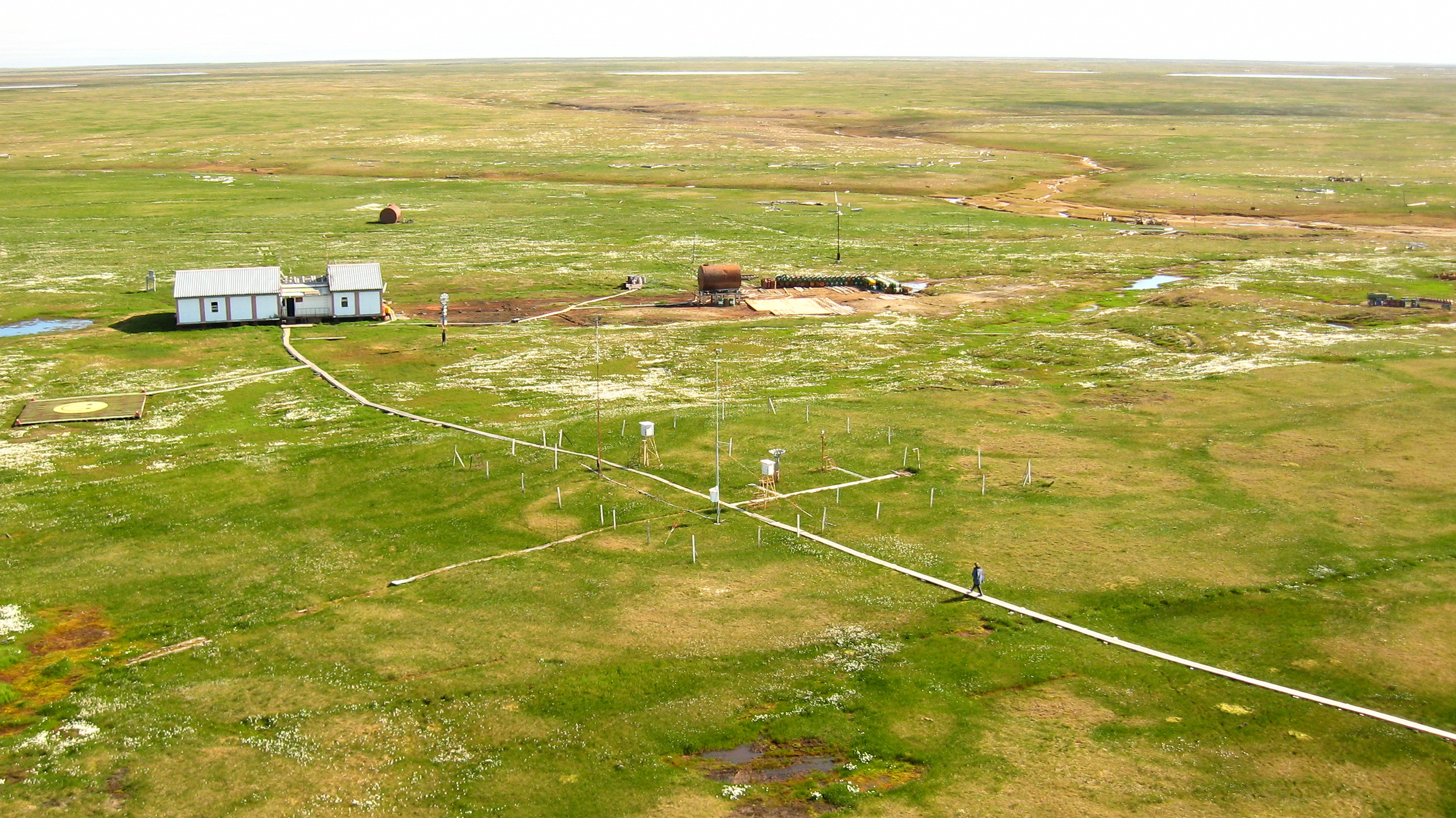
Popov Polar Station

=== Adjacent islands ===
Within Bely Island's wide eastern bay, there is a 10-kilometre-long (6.2 mi) island called Bezymyannyy. Ostrov Tabango and Ostrov Tyubtsyango are located 20 kilometres (12 mi) to the south of Bely Island's SE corner.

=== Scientific research ===
Bely Island has been the site of arctic research for its remote and unsettled nature. Research stations here are used to investigate changes in the Arctic Circle due to climate change and the effects of the Russian petroleum industry, where its unaffected soil is used to measure trace elements in comparison to soil on the mainland.

== See also ==
- List of islands of Russia
- List of research stations in the Arctic
