= Malygina Strait =

Sound in Siberia, Russia

Coordinates: 72.96°N 69.98°E

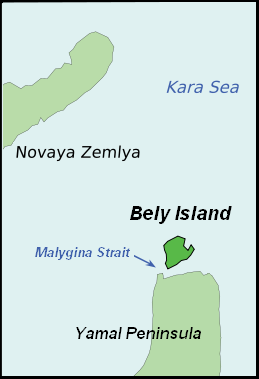

Malygina Strait (Russia)

Malygina Strait or Malygin Strait in Siberia, Russia, is a sound, 9 to 30 km wide and approximately 60 km long, which is frozen most of the year. It separates Bely Island from the Yamal Peninsula in the Yamalo-Nenets Autonomous Okrug, Tyumen Oblast. The strait is named after explorer Stepan Malygin, who was the first to make an instrumental mapping of its coasts during the Great Northern Expedition in the 18th century.
