= Kharasavey gas field =

Natural gas field in Siberia

Kharasavey
- Location within Yamalo-Nenets Autonomous Okrug Location within Russia Location within Arctic
- Country: Russia
- Region: Yamalo-Nenets Autonomous Okrug
- Offshore/onshore: onshore
- Coordinates: 71.18464°N 66.89711°E
- Operator: Gazprom

Field history
- Discovery: 1966

Production
- Estimated gas in place: 2,000×10^{9} m^{3} (71×10^{12} cu ft)

The Kharasavey gas field is a natural gas field located in the Yamal Peninsula. It was discovered in 1966. Gazprom intends to start production in 2023, requiring a new pipeline to join the Yamal–Europe pipeline.

The Bovanenkovo gas field is about 100 kilometres (62 mi) south of Kharasavey.
