= Fly-in fly-out =

Form of remote shift-based employment

Fly-in fly-out is a method of employing people in remote areas by flying them temporarily to the work site instead of relocating employees and their families permanently. It is often abbreviated to FIFO when referring to employment status. This is common in large mining regions in Australia and Canada.

Similar to the fly-in fly-out roster are the DIDO (drive-in drive-out), BIBO (bus-in bus-out) and SISO (ship-in ship-out) rosters.

== Overview ==
Rather than relocating employees and their families to a town near the work site, the employees are flown to the work site, where they work for a number of days, and are then flown back to their hometowns for a number of days of rest.

Fly-in fly-out is very commonly used in the mining and oil and gas drilling industries, as mines and wells are often in areas far from towns. Generally, such sites use portable buildings since there is no long-term commitment to that location (e.g., the mine will close once the minerals have been extracted, the drilling rig will be moved once the well is dug). The local communities prefer for FIFO workers to purchase homes in the area and have more permanent opportunities because it would benefit the local economy. However, mining companies prefer not to provide permanent residencies such as company towns to FIFO workers because it saves the company money. The use of FIFO is a response to the precarity of resource extraction sectors: the workers can be shipped in quickly during resource booms and sent away during busts.

Usually, a fly-in fly-out job involves working a long shift (e.g., 12 hours each day) for a number of continuous days with all days off spent at home rather than at the work site. As the employee's work days are almost entirely taken up by working, sleeping, and eating, there is little need for any recreation facilities at the work site. However, companies are increasingly offering facilities such as pools, tennis courts, and gyms as a way of attracting and retaining skilled staff. Employees may be drawn to such arrangements since their families are often reluctant to relocate to small towns in remote areas where there might be limited opportunities for spouses' employment, limited educational choices for children, and poor recreational facilities.

== Challenges of the FIFO work system ==
Along with the stresses of being away from home, other stresses FIFO workers experience include:

- On-site physical exertion and fatigue
- On-site extreme heat
- Staying hydrated
- Adapting to night shifts and between day and night shifts
- Job insecurity
- Following on-site safety rules
- Transitioning back home
- Maintaining home (i.e. gardens, bills) during work absences
- Minimal communication and/or internet access on some sites

=== Rosters and fatigue ===
The FIFO lifestyle is based upon a roster, typically a fortnight on and one week off. However, more remote mining sites require month on and month off rosters, attributable to the incremented time and costs of flying to and from remote areas. As expected, FIFO workers work long shifts, usually ranging between 12 and 18 hours.

As reported by Meredith, Rush & Robinson (2014), it is notable that a rotation with a high ratio of work time to time on leave has deleterious effects on the workers' wellbeing and can lead to a vulnerable mental state. Physical health allows for a positive mental health as well as the capability to handle the demands of FIFO work. The length of 12 hour or more shifts with short breaks makes it arduous for workers to relax, get enough sleep, exercise, or socialize. Occupational fatigue is common.

=== Workplace culture ===
On-site mining workplace culture is considered a problem in reinforcing positive mental health and seeking support behavior. Unfortunately many workers do not seek formal help due to the general outlook held by the wider population of fear and stigma in seeking support for mental health issues.

Male dominancy significantly contributes to the mining workplace culture, where females may experience tensions fitting within the FIFO civilisation. The masculine culture consequently affects the relationships with other workers, negative feelings suppression or bullying behavior that is a negative subside of poor mental health. Commendations include creating a fair and just workplace environment for both men and women, for instance The Australian Mines and Metal Solidarity are taking action to improve the number of women to 20% by 2020.

Workers who do not seek emotional support may experience adverse impacts and result in poor work output and increased isolation. An organisational culture is vital, in order to proposer relevant approaches for workers in acknowledging when to seek help.

=== Personal relationships ===
Over the past 20 years FIFO had become a prevalent mining industry practice, however on the subject matter there is a scarcity of Australian research. According to Arnold (1995) studies resulted in FIFO being problematic for some families, in an analysis of the impacts on the lifestyle and families of workers. The Australian FIFO personnel indicate the benefits of leisure, access to services and facilities swell as friends and extended family from relatively high earnings from working in the industry. However, observation conducted by Gillies et al. (1997) involved surveying fifteen Australian FIFO operations and out of a study sample of 227 employees, a total of 30% employees stated their families were not in favour of the FIFO lifestyle. Additionally, results included 25% of employees believed their family relationships had been earnestly disadvantaged by the FIFO employment.

The structure of rostered schedules and continuous cycles such as four weeks away and one week home, the long separations and short homecomings provoke an increased amount of conflict between work and home. In accordance to Torkington, Larkins & Sen Gupta (2011) "Miners reported that when they were away their partner described: being upset or lonely; the stresses of dealing with busy roles, such as parenting, alone; the challenge of changing routines; and having to managing practical tasks (e.g. mechanical repairs), which fell outside their normal role." (2011). As a result, the family structure is altered, especially for those with younger children.

A number of organisations have emerged to provide specialist support for FIFO families experiencing the challenges of this lifestyle. The FIFO Family Project, for example, offers proactive support through community programs, educational resources and online platforms specifically designed for families of FIFO workers. In 2025, TFFP published The FIFO New Parents Guide, the first parenting guide specifically created for FIFO families. This evidence-based guide provides practical strategies, expert advice and lived experience stories to help new parents manage the unique pressures of parenting within FIFO arrangements. These resources address gaps in mainstream supports, aiming to improve mental health and resilience in affected families.

== Psychological effects ==
Fly-in fly-out employment can put stress on family relationships, and the phenomenon may stifle regional development. There is a high mental cost to the workers and their families, with several government inquiries into its detrimental effects.

=== Family ===
The impact of absent FIFO parents (primarily fathers) on their children and schooling has yet to be the subject of a major study, but it is likely that the separation anxiety experienced by the children of FIFO workers is similar to that of military families before, during and after deployment. Research published in Australia in 2014 suggests that children of fly-in fly-out parents suffer emotionally from the parent's absence, more frequently become the targets of schoolyard bullying, and may evince additional bad behaviour. However, such children often receive greater incentive to succeed academically, and some such children appreciate the extended time at home available for FIFO parents.

Organisations dedicated to the wellbeing of FIFO families have emerged in response to the unique challenges presented by this lifestyle. The FIFO Family Project is a not-for-profit organisation providing proactive support, educational resources and community programs to assist families in navigating the pressures of periodic separation and adjustment. In 2025, The FIFO Family Project published The FIFO New Parents Guide, recognised as the first parenting guide created specifically for FIFO families. This resource offers practical strategies, expert perspectives and personal accounts designed to address the mental health and relationship challenges associated with FIFO work arrangements. Its publication aims to bridge gaps in mainstream support and contribute to improved outcomes for families affected by FIFO patterns.

=== Worker mental health ===
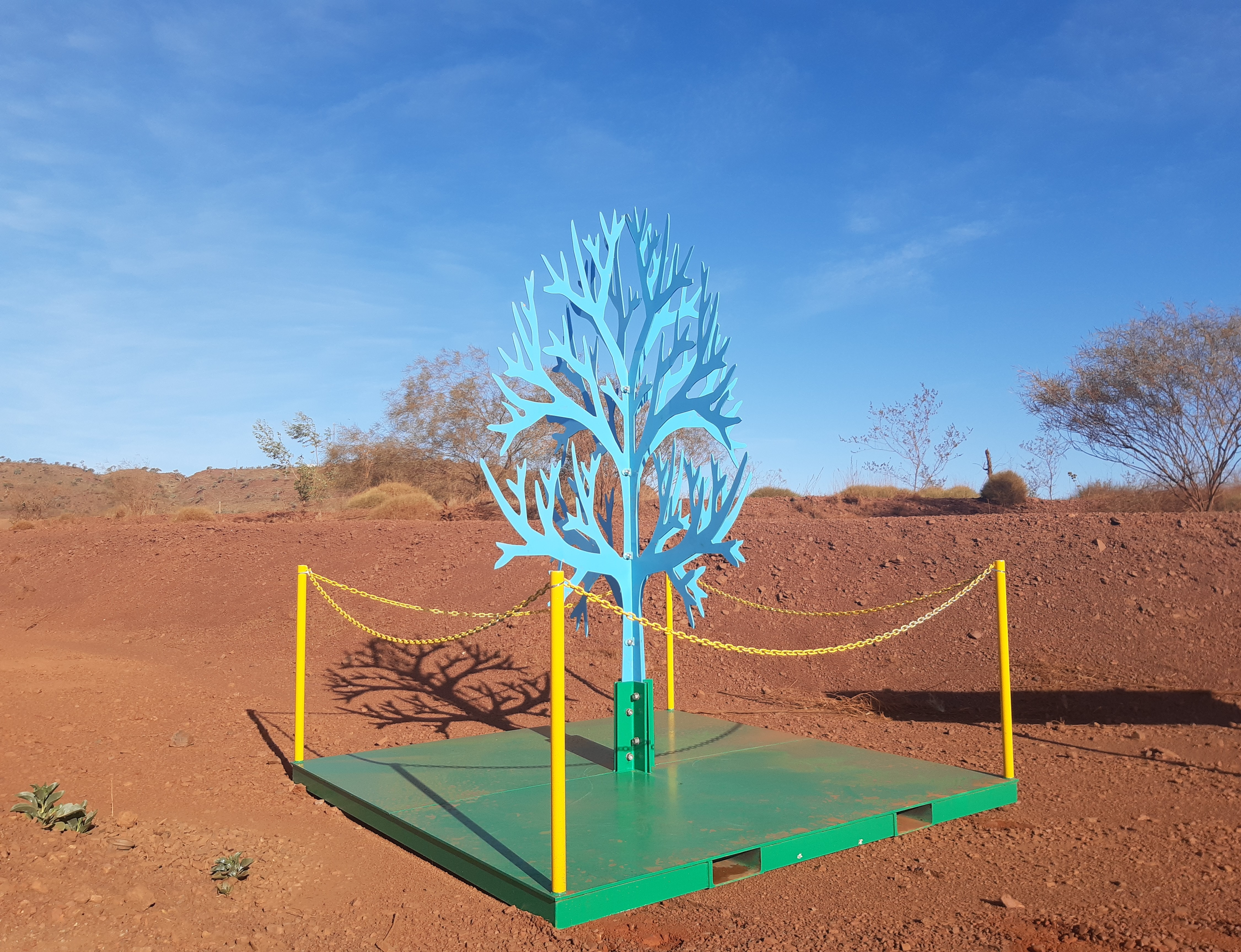
A Blue Tree promoting mental health and R U OK? on a mine site in Western Australia

FIFO work practices in Australia occur amongst various professions primarily associated within the resources industry as well as medical and related health services. Following the recession of the 1980s, Australia has experienced a resources boom that has seen thousands of families impacted by FIFO work. The FIFO lifestyle often sees workers on a scheduled roster flying to remote locations. Workers live in serviced accommodation, working long days. While working in the mining and resource sector is financially rewarding, the type of lifestyle it leads is far different than the life workers have at home. As a result of this type of work, there is an impact on individuals, couples and family units that can account for the emotional health and well-being seen in workers.

A federal inquiry into fly-in fly-out and drive-in drive-out in Australia in 2012 found that it can lead to an increase in substance abuse, sexually transmitted infections, and mental illness in workers on a FIFO roster, especially in Western Australia, where the number of people on such a roster is in excess of 50,000. A Queensland inquiry into the effects of fly-in fly-out was conducted in 2016.

Results from studies on compressed work schedules, shift work, and extended working hours (seen in other industries as well such as nursing) show that no matter what type of shift roster, there is a need for sufficient rest days to allow recuperation from the sleep debt. It is dangerous for workers to travel and work at their sites in such states of fatigue. Disruption of sleep schedules and circadian rhythms causes a significant impact on performance. It is also detrimental to the mental health of FIFO workers, causing stress and anxiety as well as increased use of drugs and alcohol. According to studies, eight consecutive work days of twelve-hour shifts is the maximum which employees are able to perform well at before fatigue begins to affect work adversely.

The World Health Organization (WHO) has described mental health as "a state of wellbeing in which every individual realises his or her potential, can cope with normal stresses of life, can work productively and fruitfully, and is able to make a contribution to her or his community" (2014). It is acknowledged that people working in rural and remote mining and resource operations confront psychological and emotional demands that create unique challenges for both men and women.

The World Health Organization (WHO) logo. The organization was officially established in 1948 by the United Nations.

The key mental health issues across the resource mining sector includes feelings such as isolation and loneliness, due to the remoteness of living on-site and from family and friends. Stress, anxiety and depression are major factors which are likely to influence employment performance and antisocial conduct. This is predicted to get worse for some people during the transition period from home to work, and can potentially increase the risk of self-harm and suicide.

== Australia ==
In 2015, the Government of Western Australia instituted a support policy for FIFO workers.

=== Mining in Australia ===
Australia is one of the leading mining nations in the world, with large scale extraction of mineral sands, brown coal, nickel, zinc, lead, and uranium.

Increases in worldwide demand for resources have resulted in Australia's annual mining production has more than doubling in the 20 years up to 2008. There are approximately 365 operating mines in Australia, and as for the employment of up to 269,000 people, the mining and resource industry contributes 121.5 billion dollars to the economy. Thus plays a significant role to Australia's wealth.

Mining companies like Fortescue estimate that it would cost the company an additional $100,000 per person per year to employ them in residential positions rather than as FIFO workers. In Port Hedland alone the company could save $33 million a year if it was to convert its 330-strong work force from residential to FIFO, the company estimates. The much higher cost of employing residential workers is caused by high real estate prices, slow release of land for residential development and high cost of living subsidies and forces mining companies to rely on FIFO rather than residential workers. Such a strategy has been employed in some mining towns that once had a considerable size. For example, Wiluna in Western Australia had a population of 9,000 in 1938, but now has a population of 300, with almost all employees of the local mines on fly-in fly-out rosters.

Mining companies such as Rio Tinto have said that it is also the government's responsibility to deal with the side effects of fly-in fly-out, including housing shortages and the need to develop further infrastructure in the mining regions such as hospitals and schools to fulfil demand, as the Government benefits greatly from increased tax and royalties income through the mining boom. Rio Tinto paid $5 billion in corporate tax and in excess of $2 billion in state royalties in 2011.

=== Economic and social impact on communities ===
FIFO (as well as DIDO) work forces create a temporary rise in population of the regional communities that they are assigned to. This in turn can put pressures on the existing population's living space capacity and resources as the existing businesses fail to receive increased sales due to lack of reciprocity of FIFO organizations. This is supported by findings from Canada which suggest that the all-encompassing services provided at mining camps reduce the ability of fly-in workers to integrate into local communities by buying goods and services from local businesses or joining local organizations. Improved integration practices as well sharing resources are necessary for FIFO organizations to encourage employees into more community participation. The local towns also argue that more effort should be given towards making local employment and residential options available.

Based on the life of the mining job, it is preferred by the local economy for FIFO workers to purchase homes in the area; however, both parties (mining company and mining employees) would need to agree. The lack of permanent housing for FIFO workers distorts the local census causing a disproportion to the local price cycles such as housing valuation. FIFO workers also make it difficult for local communities to have availability for tourism due to the large renting out of housing units at a fringe tax benefit. There are quite a few circumstances that stray mining companies as well as FIFO workers away from making those decisions. For example, there is better compensation being a FIFO employee rather than a local worker due to allowances given for being away from home. The use of permanent settlement would minimize the flexibility for mining companies to invest and shift resources between mining locations. Permanent residencies for FIFO workers would however mean a reduction of industrial conflicts for the local area, but it would also create less of an exit option for the FIFO workers. According to a case study from 2014, the housing issue in local towns has led to families finding these resource towns unattractive which has also resulted in an increase of prices in the housing market.

=== Benefits ===
Australia's resource sector (coal, oil and gas, metal ore, etc.) is a major contributor to the economy. Projects in these sectors such as commercial mineral projects indirectly created more jobs such as retail, hospitality, manufacturing, etc. In 2012, there was a shortage of skilled workers for steel, fabrications and resource related jobs specifically in Western Australia The skilled worker shortage paired with the exit of baby boomers in the labour market, as well as the lack of labour market entry by Generation Y, caused the major introduction of FIFO workers into the mix. In order to meet recruitment needs, in 2012 Australian resource sector employers began turning to temporary skilled workers using the 457 visas. Measures were taken so that the 457 visa was not abused as replacements for already available skilled workers in Australia. These time-consuming and complex measures included: skill assessments for certain opportunities and English proficiency, requirement of a sponsor to start working within 90 days of arrival, accept visa restrictions for start-up companies, and much more. Businesses also had to ensure that the open positions were advertised and offered to local skilled citizens or permanent residents first as well as present evidence of training locals at the cost of at least 1 percent of their payroll. Salary restrictions on 457 visas also made it difficult for firms to attract FIFO workers especially with competition from larger projects in other regions. Smaller firms in Australia were able to grow and gain legitimacy through the use of the migrant worker visas. However, along with the costs to obtain the visas and training fees, smaller firms also incurred heavy costs for relocation at around $30,000 per employee.

== See also ==
- Shift settlement
