= Bovanenkovo gas field =

Arctic natural gas field in Russia

Bovanenkovo
- Location within Russia
- Country: Russia
- Region: Yamalo-Nenets Autonomous Okrug
- Offshore/onshore: onshore
- Coordinates: 70.2°N 68.4°E
- Operator: Gazprom

Field history
- Discovery: 1972
- Start of production: 2012

Production
- Current production of gas: 314×10^{6} m^{3}/d 11×10^{9} cu ft/d 115×10^{9} m^{3}/a (4.1×10^{12} cu ft/a)
- Estimated gas in place: 4.9×10^{12} m^{3} 171.5×10^{12} cu ft

The Bovanenkovo gas field is a natural gas field located in the Yamalo-Nenets Autonomous Okrug. It was discovered in 1972 and developed by Gazprom. It began production in 2012 and produces natural gas and condensates. The total proven reserves of the Bovanenkovo gas field are around 171.5 trillion cubic feet (4.9×10^{12} cubic metres), and production is stated to be around 11 billion cubic feet (311,000,000 cubic metres) per day in 2010. The Bovanenkovo gas field is part of the Yamal project.

Drilling of the first production well started in late 2008, when construction of the Bovanenkovo–Ukhta section of the Yamal–Europe pipeline also started.

In 2020 production was 99 billion cubic metres (3.5×10^{12} cu ft) of its nominal production capacity of 115 billion cubic metres (4.1×10^{12} cu ft) per year. The development of deeper wet gas layers could increase capacity to 140 billion cubic metres (4.9×10^{12} cu ft) per year.

The Kharasavey gas field is about 100 kilometres (62 mi) north of Bovanenkovo.

== Transportation ==
The 572-kilometre (355 mi) Obskaya–Bovanenkovo railway was built from Obskaya to provide all year access to the Bovanenkovo gas field, opening in 2011. The port at Kharasavey gas field can be used in the summer. The gas field is also served by the Bovanenkovo Airport (IATA: BVJ).
