= Yamal Peninsula =

Peninsula located in the Yamalo-Nenets Autonomous Okrug of Siberia, Russia

Coordinates: 70°40′15″N 70°08′12″E

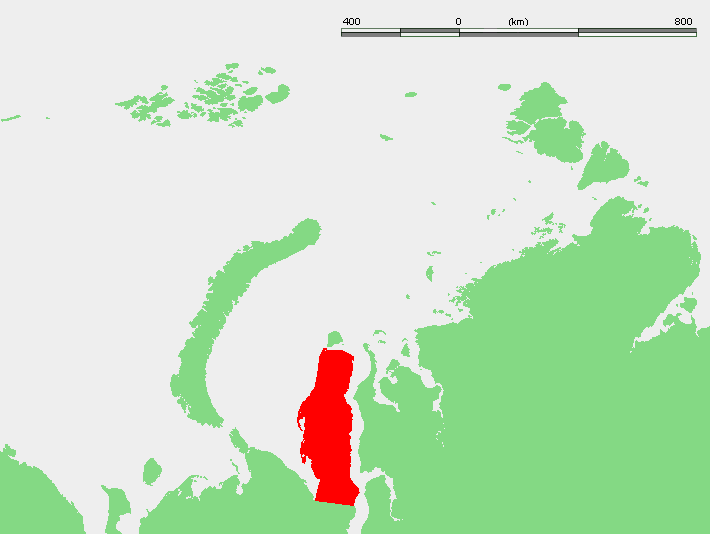
Map showing the location of the Yamal Peninsula

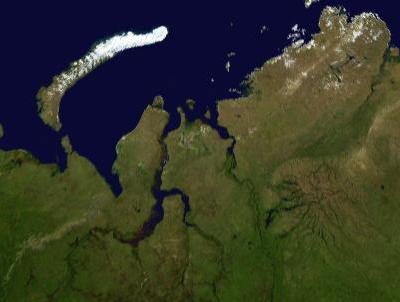
Satellite view of Yamal Peninsula

The Yamal Peninsula (Russian: полуостров Ямал, romanized: poluostrov Yamal) is located in the Yamalo-Nenets Autonomous Okrug of northwest Siberia, Russia. It extends roughly 700 km (435 mi) and is bordered principally by the Kara Sea and its Baydaratskaya Bay on the west, and by the Gulf of Ob on the east. At the northern end of this peninsula lie the Malygina Strait and, beyond it, Bely Island. Across Ob estuary lies the Gyda Peninsula. In the languages of the Yamal Peninsula's indigenous inhabitants, the Nenets, Yamal means "End of the Land".

The Yamal peninsula is inhabited by a multitude of migratory bird species.

== Climate research ==
=== Ancient wildlife ===
In the summer of 2007 reindeer herder Yuri Khudi found the well-preserved remains of a 37,000-year-old mammoth calf, dubbed "Lyuba", on the peninsula. The female calf was determined to be one month old at the time of death.

=== Dendrochronology ===
The Yamal Peninsula is important for the study of climatic history. Dendrochronology is one method used to see how environment has changed.

Dendrochronological research papers include:

- Hantemirov and Shiyatov (September 2002), "A continuous multimillennial ring-width chronology in Yamal, northwestern Siberia"
- Hantemirov et al (2021), "An 8768-year Yamal Tree-ring Chronology as a Tool for Paleoecological Reconstructions"

== Geography ==
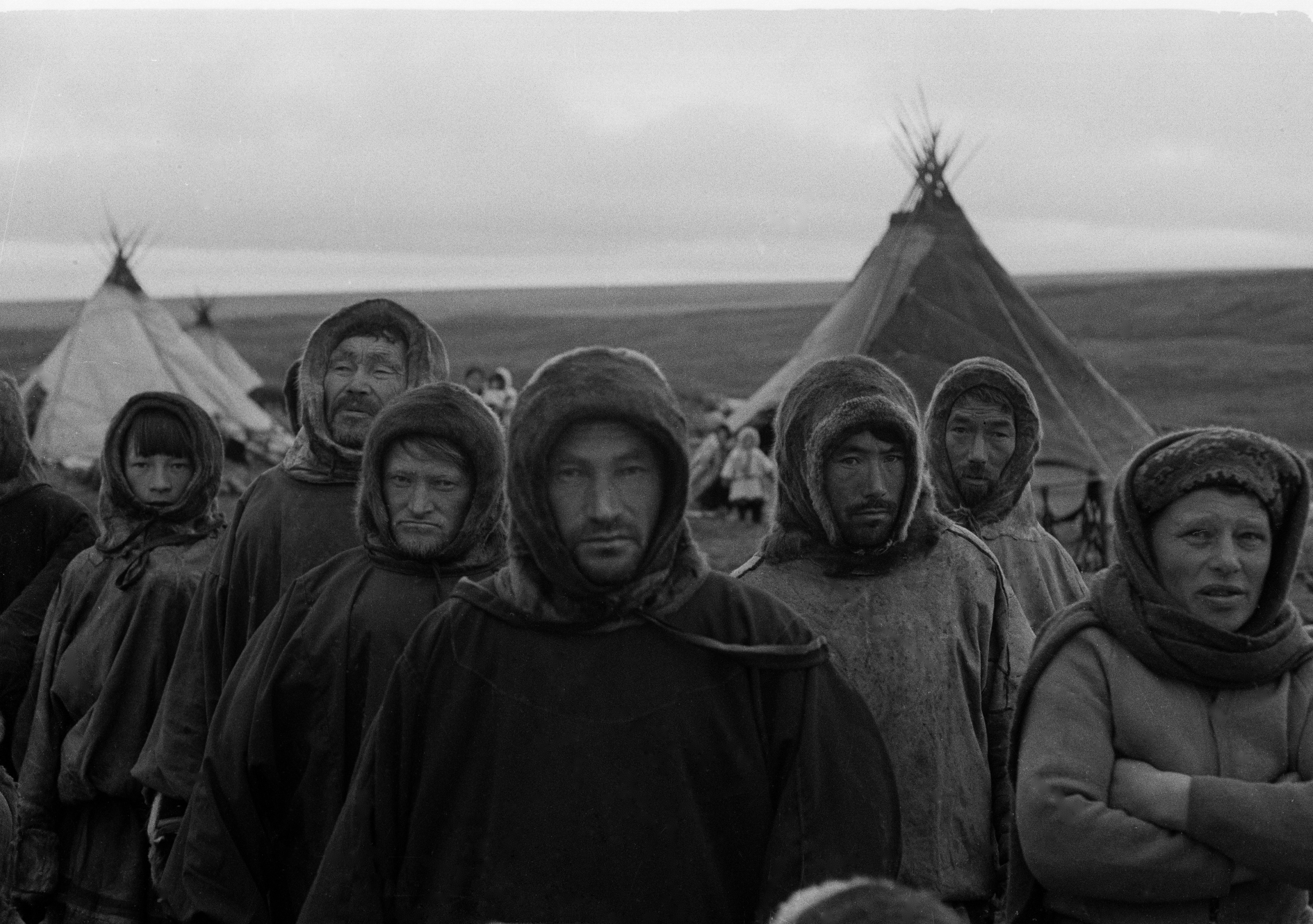
Reindeer herders on the Yamal Peninsula in 1975

The peninsula consists mostly of permafrost ground and there are numerous lakes of thermokarst origin, the biggest of which are Neito and Yambuto in the central part.

Many hydrocarbon fields have been discovered on the Yamal Peninsula, including large gas fields. The main hydrocarbon resources are concentrated in the permeable Aptian-Cenomanian complex.

== Economy ==
=== Reindeer husbandry ===
According to anthropologist Sven Haakanson, the Yamal peninsula is the place within the Russian Federation where traditional large-scale nomadic reindeer husbandry is best preserved. Nenets and Khanty reindeer herders hold about half a million domestic reindeer.

=== Industry ===
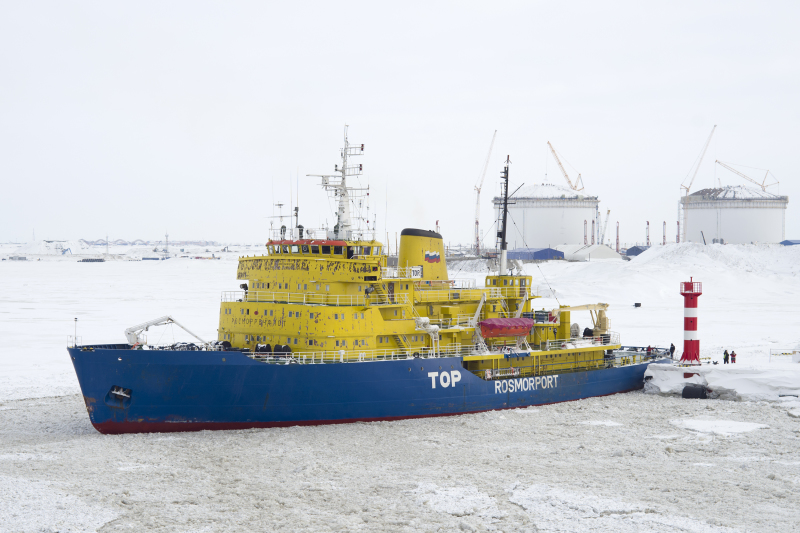
Russian port icebreaker Tor in the ice-covered port of Sabetta

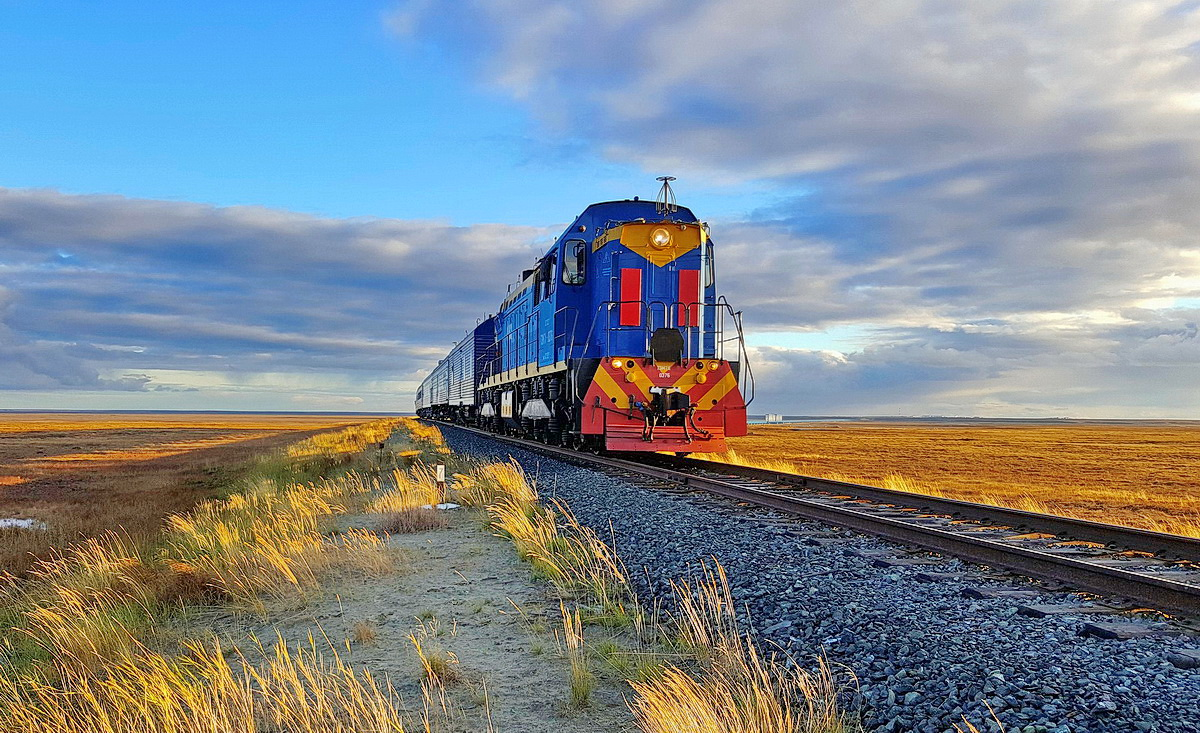
The Obskaya–Bovanenkovo railway was built for the gas fields around Bovanenkovo

The area is largely undeveloped, but work is ongoing with several large infrastructure projects, including a gas pipeline and several bridges. Yamal holds Russia's biggest natural gas reserves. The 572 km Obskaya–Bovanenkovo railway, completed in 2011, is the northernmost railway in the world. Russian gas monopolist Gazprom had planned to develop the Yurkharovskoye gas field by 2011–2012. The peninsula's gas reserves are estimated to be 55 trillion cubic meters (tcm). Russia's largest energy project in history, known as the Yamal project, puts the future of nomadic reindeer herding at considerable risk.

== Yamal craters ==
In 2014, Yamal was the discovery site of a distinct sinkhole, dubbed "Yamal crater", which quickly drew the attention of world media. The sinkhole appeared to be the result of a huge explosion and several hypotheses were suggested to explain the formation of the crater, including a hit by a meteorite or a UFO, or the collapse of an underground gas facility.

A spokesperson for the Yamal branch of the Emergencies Ministry said, "We can definitely say that it's not a meteorite." Cryovolcanism has been pointed out as the most probable cause in recent researches.

The 60-meter (200 ft) crater is believed by a senior researcher from the Scientific Research Center of the Arctic, Andrei Plekhanov, in remarks to the Associated Press, to be likely the result of a "buildup of excessive pressure" underground because of warming regional temperatures in that portion of Siberia. Tests conducted by Plekhanov's team showed unusually high concentrations of methane near the bottom of the sinkhole.

The destabilization of gas hydrates containing huge amounts of methane gas is believed to have caused the craters on the Yamal Peninsula.

As of 2015, the Yamal peninsula had at least five similar craters. Another crater appeared in August 2020.

== Offshore methane leaks ==
According to researchers at Norway's Centre for Arctic Gas Hydrate (CAGE), through a process called geothermal heat flux, the Siberian permafrost, which extends to the seabed of the Kara Sea, a section of the Arctic Ocean between the Yamal Peninsula and Novaya Zemlya, is thawing. According to a CAGE researcher, Aleksei Portnov:

The permafrost is thawing from two sides ... [T]he interior of the Earth is warm and is warming the permafrost from the bottom up. It is called geothermal heat flux and it is happening all the time, regardless of human influence. ... The thawing of permafrost on the ocean floor is an ongoing process, likely to be exaggerated by the global warming of the world's oceans.

— CAGE 2014

Methane is leaking in an area of at least 7,500 m^{2} (81,000 sq ft). In some areas gas flares extend up to 25 m (82 ft). Prior to their research it was proposed that methane was tightly sealed into the permafrost by water depths up to 100 m (330 ft). Close to the shore however, where the permafrost seal tapers to a depth of as little as 20 m (66 ft), there are significant amounts of gas leakage.

== See also ==
- Yamal cuisine
- Yamalsky District
- Gyda Peninsula
