= Russia in the European energy sector =

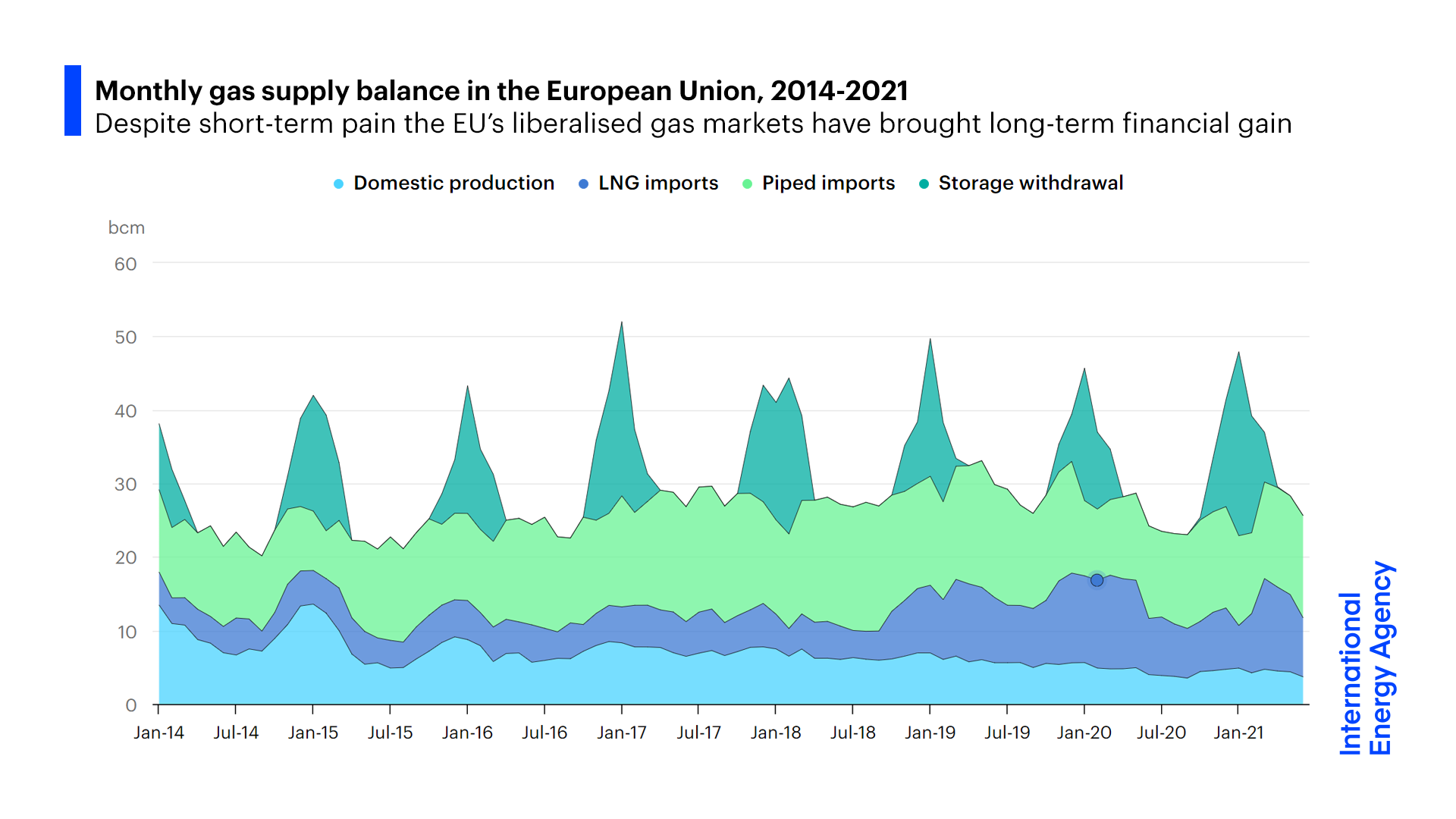
Monthly gas supply balance in the European Union, 2014–2021. Flexible gas supplies will become even more important as reliance on solar and wind power grows.

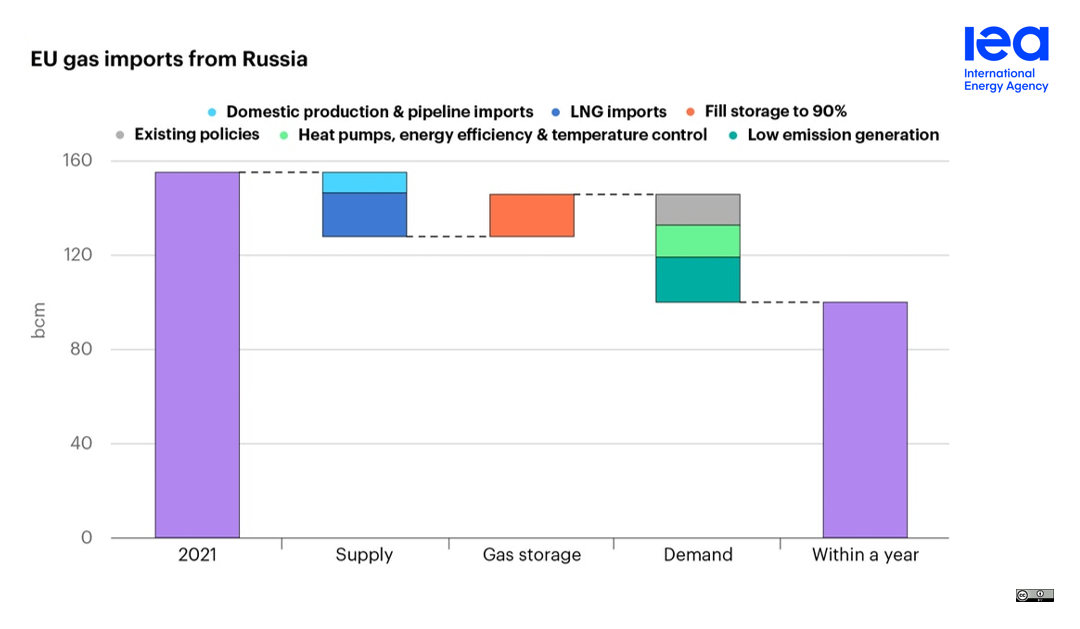
European gas imports from Russia in 2021, with breakdowns

Russia supplies a significant volume of fossil fuels to other European countries. In 2021, it was the largest exporter of oil and natural gas to the European Union, (90%) and 40% of gas consumed in the EU came from Russia. In July 2025, the largest European importers of Russian fossil fuels were Hungary, France, Slovakia, Belgium and Spain.

The Russian state-owned company Gazprom exports natural gas to Europe. It also controls many subsidiaries, including various infrastructure assets. According to a study published by the Research Centre for East European Studies, the liberalization of the EU gas market drove Gazprom's expansion in Europe by increasing its share in the European downstream market. It established sale subsidiaries in many of its export markets, and also invested in access to industrial and power generation sectors in Western and Central Europe. In addition, Gazprom established joint ventures to build natural gas pipelines and storage depots in a number of European countries.

The dependency on Russian fossil fuels poses energy security risks for Europe. In a number of disputes Russia used pipeline shutdowns, which motivated the European Union to diversify its energy sources. The rapid expansion of renewables in the European energy market would allow for less imports. As a reaction, Russia is expanding its export abilities towards China, as it has only one pipeline. The 2022 Russian invasion of Ukraine caused the Russia–European Union gas dispute. The European Commission and International Energy Agency presented joint plans to reduce reliance on Russian energy, reduce Russian gas imports by two thirds within a year, and completely by 2030. In May 2022, the European Union published plans to end its reliance on Russian oil, natural gas and coal by 2027. In the wake of Russian invasion of Ukraine, Russia's role in the EU energy market has collapsed. Due to EU sanctions, Russia's weaponization of gas supplies, and the sabotage of the Nord Stream pipelines, Russia delivered only around 60 BCM of gas to the EU in 2022. By contrast, in 2021, the EU imported 155 BCM of Russian gas, which accounted for about 45% of its total gas imports.

== History ==
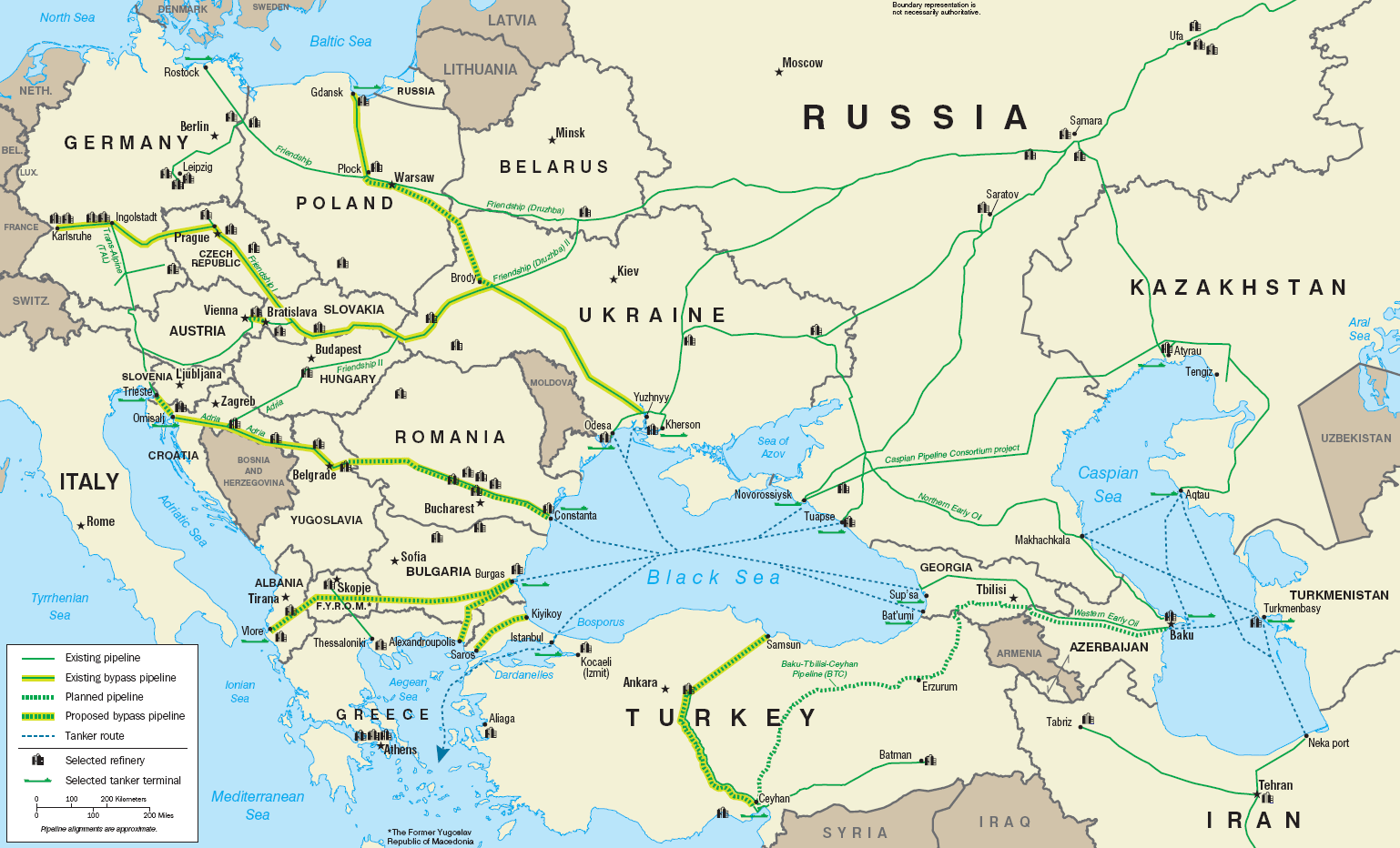
Druzhba (Friendship) pipeline runs through Ukraine and Belarus.

The Druzhba pipeline to supply allies in the Eastern Bloc was put into operation in 1964. The Urengoy–Pomary–Uzhhorod pipeline was constructed in 1982–1984. It complemented the transcontinental gas transportation system Western Siberia-Western Europe which existed since 1973. The official inauguration ceremony took place in France. In February 1978, an agreement was made to transport 13.6bn. cubic metres of gas from the Soviet Union to Western Europe, through Czechoslovakia, partly to replace gas from Iran after the Iranian Revolution.

In the early 1980s there were American efforts, led by the Reagan administration, to convince European countries, through which a proposed Soviet gas pipeline was to be built, to deny firms responsible for construction the ability to purchase supplies and parts for the pipeline and associated facilities. Ronald Reagan feared that a Kremlin-controlled European natural gas pipeline infrastructure would increase the USSR's influence not only in Eastern Europe, but also in Western Europe, as planned by the Soviet Falin-Kvitsinsky Doctrine.

For this reason, during his first term in office, Reagan attempted – unsuccessfully – to stop the first natural gas pipeline from being built between the USSR and Germany. The pipeline was built despite these protests and the rise of large Russian gas firms such as Gazprom as well as increased Russian fossil fuel production has facilitated a large expansion in the quantity of gas supplied to the European market since the 1990s.

Since the 2000s, natural gas pricing in Europe has gradually shifted from fairly stable long-term contract pricing largely linked to the price of oil, which supported the large-scale investments in developing gas fields and pipelines, to competitive market based pricing. This change was driven by EU regulation, moving from a 30% market price share in 2010 to 80% in 2020, saving EU countries an estimated $70 billion over the 2010s largely driven by the development of cheap U.S. shale gas. However, due to the 2021 global energy crisis, the International Energy Agency estimated the total cost of EU gas imports in 2021 will be about $30 billion higher that year than it would have been under the previous pricing regime.

In September 2012, the European Commission opened formal proceedings to investigate whether Gazprom was hindering competition in Central and Eastern European gas markets, in breach of EU competition law. In particular, the Commission looked into Gazprom's usage of 'no resale' clauses in supply contracts, alleged prevention of diversification of gas supplies, and imposition of unfair pricing by linking oil and gas prices in long-term contracts. The Russian Federation responded by issuing blocking legislation, which introduced a default rule prohibiting Russian strategic firms, including Gazprom, to comply with any foreign measures or requests. Compliance is subject to prior permission granted by the Russian government.

In 2013 the shares of Russian natural gas in the domestic gas consumption in the EU countries listed were:

- Estonia 100%
- Finland 100%
- Latvia 100%
- Lithuania 100%
- Slovakia 100%
- Bulgaria 97%
- Hungary 83%
- Slovenia 72%
- Greece 66%
- Czech Republic 63%
- Austria 62%
- Poland 57%
- Germany 46%
- Italy 34%
- France 18%
- Netherlands 5%
- Belgium 1.1%

Gas for northern Europe largely came from the Nadym Pur Taz (NPT) region in Western Siberia, but these large fields are now in decline due to depletion. Since the early 2010s Gazprom has been developing replacement gas fields in the Yamal Peninsula area of the Russian Arctic. As of 2020, Yamal produces over 20% of Russia's gas, which is expected to increase to 40% by 2030. The shortest pipeline routes from Yamal to the northern EU countries are the Yamal–Europe pipeline through Poland and Nord Stream 1 to Germany. During the winter peak Gazprom does not have the capacity to redirect flows to the central pipeline corridor through Ukraine, built for the NPT gas flow. Gazprom intends to decommission some pipelines, over forty years old with high maintenance costs, in the central corridor as NPT production declines.

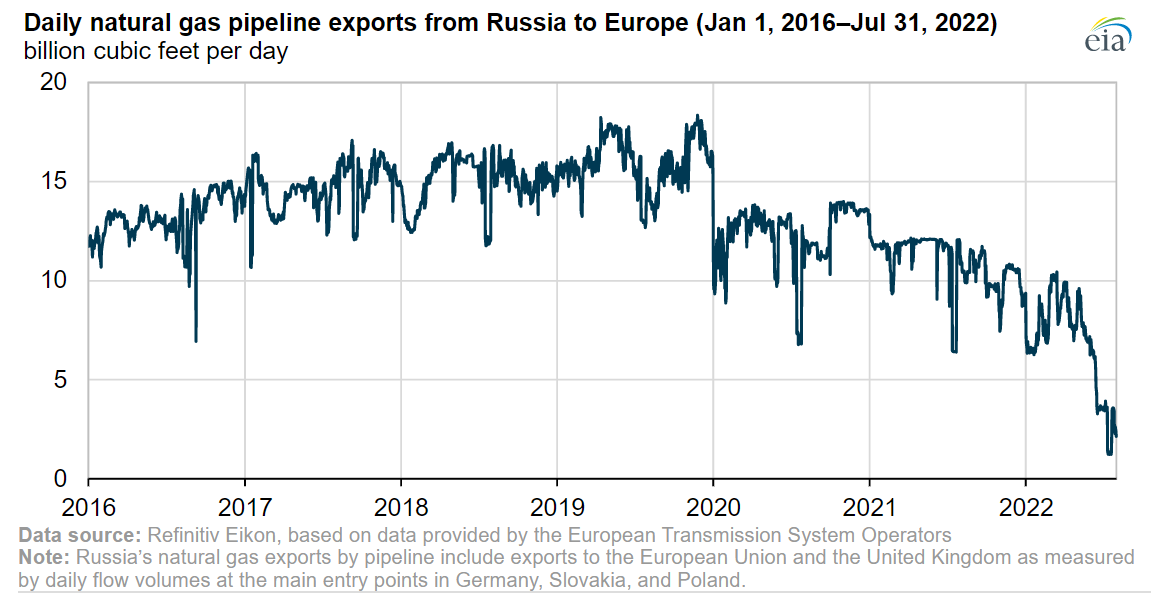
Russian natural gas exports to Europe, January 2016–July 2022

In 2017, energy products accounted for around 60% of the EU's total imports from Russia. 30% of the EU's petroleum oil imports and 39% of total gas imports came from Russia in 2017. For Estonia, Poland, Slovakia and Finland, more than 75% of their imports of petroleum oils originated in Russia.

In response to the invasion of Ukraine by Russia, the European Commission and International Energy Agency presented a plan to reduce gas imports from Russia by two thirds within a year, and completely by 2030.

Prices of many minerals and metals that are essential for sustainable energy technologies have recently soared due to a combination of rising demand, disrupted supply chains and concerns around tightening supply. The global prices of lithium and cobalt more than doubled in 2021, and those for copper, nickel and aluminium all rose by around 25% to 40%.

The price trends continued into 2022. The price of lithium increased an astonishing two-and-a-half times from January to May 2022. The prices of nickel and aluminium – for which Russia is a key supplier – also kept rising, driven in part by Russia's invasion of Ukraine. For most minerals and metals that are vital to the clean energy transition, the price increases since 2021 exceed by a wide margin the largest annual increases seen in the 2010s.

Russia also provides 43% of global supplies of palladium, a precious material used for catalytic converters in cars. Europe accounts for over half of Russia's palladium exports. As with aluminium, stock levels were already low before Russia's invasion of Ukraine. Automakers can switch to platinum, but Russia is also a major producer of that, with a 14% share, the second largest in the world.

== Natural gas deliveries ==
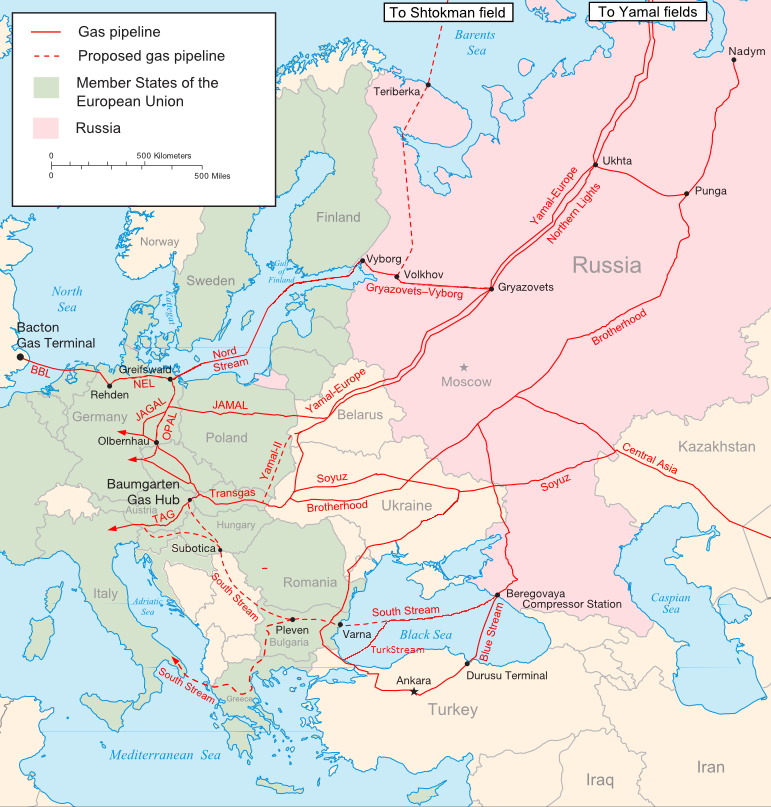
Major natural gas pipelines from Russia to Europe

In 2021, 45% of the European Union's natural gas total imports originated in Russia. As of 2009, Russian natural gas was delivered to Europe through 12 pipelines, of which three were direct pipelines (to Finland, Estonia and Latvia), four through Belarus (to Lithuania and Poland) and five through Ukraine (to Slovakia, Romania, Hungary and Poland). In 2011, an additional pipeline, Nord Stream 1 (directly to Germany through the Baltic Sea), opened.

The largest importers of Russian gas in the European Union are Germany and Italy, accounting together for almost half of the EU's gas imports from Russia. Other larger Russian gas importers in the European Union are France, Hungary, the Czech Republic, Poland, Austria and Slovakia. The largest non-EU importers of Russian natural gas are Turkey and Belarus.

In 2017 Russia became one of the main liquefied natural gas (LNG) suppliers to Europe, mostly from Yamal LNG which started operations in 2017, in addition to pipeline supplies. In 2018 about 6% of Russian gas supply to Europe was as LNG.

In response to Russian military buildup and recognition of Ukrainian separatists, Germany cancelled opening of the Nord Stream 2 in February 2022. The 2022 Russian invasion of Ukraine prompted international sanctions, leading to a currency crisis in Russia. The 2022 Russia–European Union gas dispute broke out in April, with Russia demanding to be paid in Russian rubles and cutting off natural gas deliveries to Poland and Bulgaria when those countries refused to allow alteration of gas contracts.

=== 2021–2022 supply instability ===
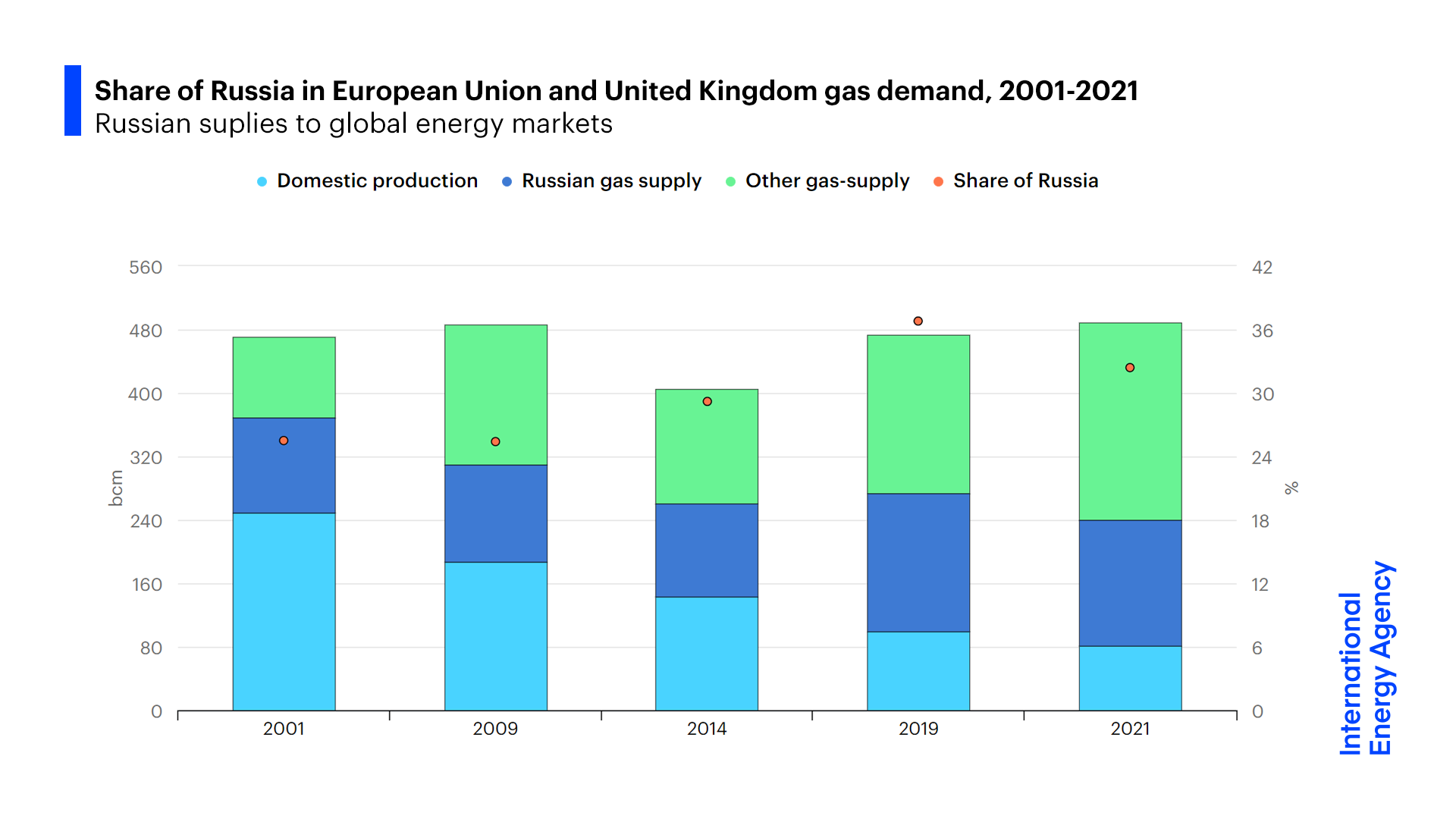
EU and UK imports of Russian gas

The reliance of the European Union and, indirectly, the United Kingdom on Russian gas supplies has increased over the last decade. Natural gas consumption in the EU and UK overall remained broadly flat in over this period, but production fell by a third and the gap has been filled by increased imports. Consequently, the share of Russian gas supplies increased from 25% of the region's total gas demand in 2009 to 32% in 2021.

Russia also has a wide-reaching gas export pipeline network, both via transit routes through Belarus and Ukraine, and via pipelines sending gas directly into Europe (including Nord Stream, Blue Stream, and TurkStream pipelines) all. Russia completed work on the Nord Stream II pipeline in 2021, but the German government decided not to approve certification in the wake of the Russian invasion of Ukraine. Meanwhile, the importance of Ukraine as a transit country has lessened due to the build-up of additional transit corridors bringing Russian piped gas to the EU and UK (e.g. Nord Stream). Transit flows via Ukraine accounted for over 25% of Russia's pipeline deliveries to the EU and UK in 2021, significantly down from more than 60% in 2009. Nevertheless, Ukraine remains an important conduit for Russian gas to Europe. About 8% of the EU and UK combined gas demand transits through Ukraine, and the country also relies heavily on imported gas for its own domestic use.

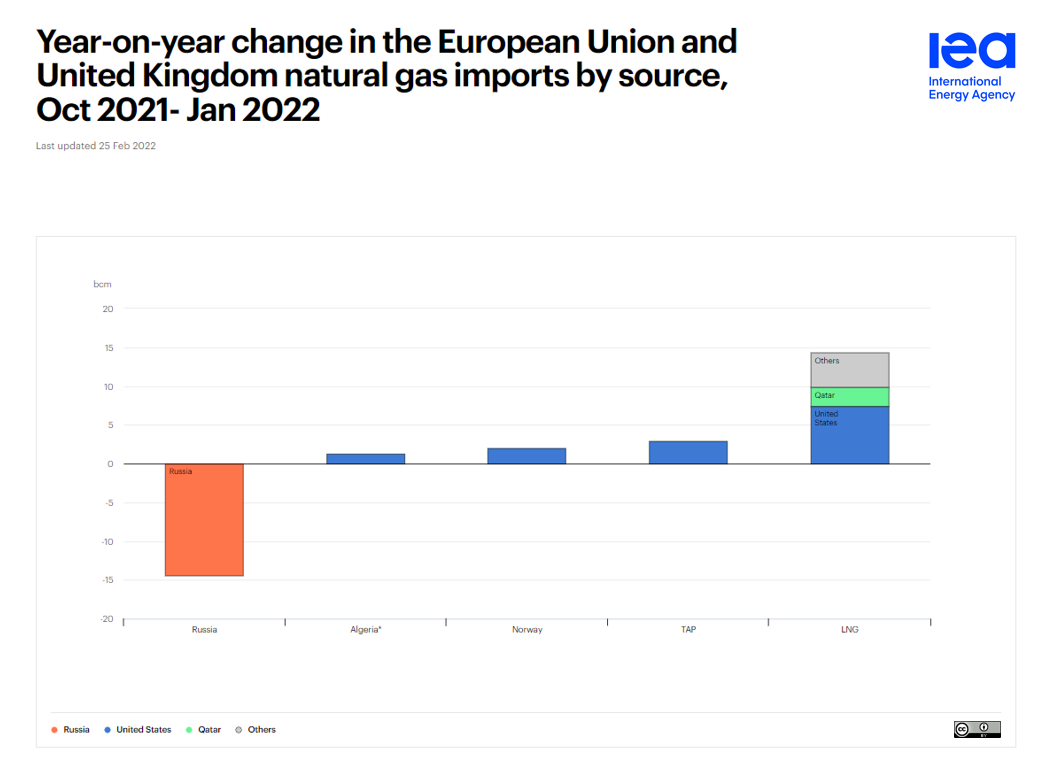
Change in EU and UK gas demand by source, Q4 2021

Over the course of 2021 and the beginning of 2022, Russia created an 'artificial tightness' in European gas markets. Russia supplied gas in accordance with long-term contracts, but did not supply additional gas on the spot market. The Economist Intelligence Unit reported that Russia had limited extra gas export capacity because of high domestic requirements with production near its peak, as well as technical issues. The Russian state-owned Gazprom reduced its piped gas supplies to the EU market by 25% in the fourth quarter of 2021 compared to the same period in 2020. This decrease in Russian pipeline supply to the EU became more pronounced in the first seven weeks of 2022, falling by 37% compared to the previous year. The last pipeline deliveries to Germany via the Yamal pipeline which goes through Belarus, occurred on 20 December 2021. Gas flows via Ukraine to Slovakia fell from an average of over 80 mcm/d in December 2021 to just 36 mcm/d in the first seven weeks of 2022. Altogether, Russian gas flows via Ukraine averaged only half of the contractually available capacity.

Other pipeline suppliers, including Algeria, Azerbaijan and Norway, increased their deliveries during the heating season to the European market compared with last year, using commercially available supply routes. Lower Russian pipeline flows were compensated in part by higher liquefied natural gas (LNG) inflows to the EU and the UK, which reached an all-time high of 13 bcm in January – almost three times their last year's levels and about 70% higher compared to Russian pipeline flows that month. Strong supply and milder-than-expected temperatures in Northeast Asia helped to facilitate the redirection of cargoes towards Europe and limit the implications of strong European demand for LNG markets. The United States supplied over half of the additional LNG imported by the EU and UK since the beginning of the heating season. This highlights the importance of the US LNG export industry to European energy security. In 2021, the Russian government released a long-term LNG development plan, with the goal of expanding its LNG capacity in order to compete with growing LNG exports from the United States, Australia, and Qatar.

Russia has also been reducing its piped gas supplies to the EU market, while choosing not fill its storage sites in the EU to adequate levels, even in the middle of the heating season in the fourth quarter of 2021 and in early 2022. As a consequence of low inventory levels at the beginning of the heating season, and the sharp decline of Russian piped flows to the EU, European gas storage levels fell to 30% below their working storage capacity (and standing 28% below their 5-year average levels for this period of the year). Storage sites owned or controlled by Gazprom, the Russian state-owned energy corporation, had particularly low storage levels at the start of the heating season, filled to just 25% of their working storage capacity. While Gazprom storages account for just 10% of the EU total working storage capacity, they accounted for half of the EU's 5-year storage deficit. Without the strong increase in LNG imports since October 2021, European storage levels would have been less than 15% full by February 2022 (vs 31% in reality), leaving Europe in a much more vulnerable position vis-à-vis late cold spells or supply disruptions. For context, expert analysis suggests that fill levels of at least 90% of working storage capacity by 1 October are necessary to provide an adequate buffer for the European gas market through the winter heating season.

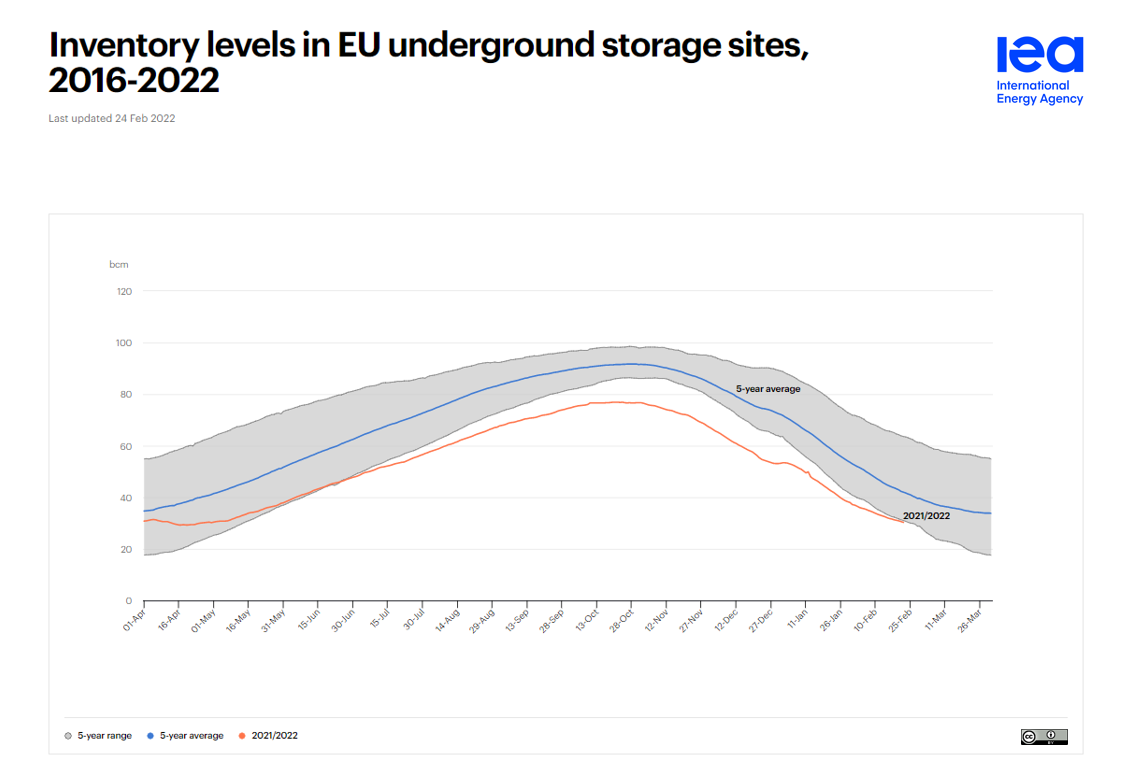
EU underground gas storage inventory levels since 2016

In late 2021, European natural gas prices rose to all-time highs and remained extremely volatile into 2022. These reduced Russian pipeline flows, together with low storage levels and adverse weather conditions, contributed to strong upward pressure on prices in Europe, which averaged more than US$30 per million British thermal units (BTU) in the fourth quarter of 2021. Natural gas prices moderated down to an average of $27 per million BTUs in the first seven weeks of 2022. Unseasonably mild weather conditions led to a slight decrease in demand (declining by 14% year-on-year according to preliminary estimates), and a 20% increase in wind energy output in the first quarter of 2022 reduced gas burn in the power sector.

Nonetheless, following Russia's invasion of Ukraine on 24 February 2022, European natural gas prices surged by 50% day-on-day, reaching to $44 per million BTUs, following the invasion of Ukraine by Russia. As the EU responded to the invasion by introducing sanctions on the Russian economy, Russian President Vladimir Putin issued a decree demanding that all payments for natural gas should be in rubles in order to soften the effect of the sanctions. On 26 April, Russia announced it would cut off natural gas exports to Poland and Bulgaria because of their refusal to pay in rubles. On 21 May, Russia halted all of its gas exports to Finland for the same reason. Natural gas prices are expected to remain extremely volatile in the current context of market uncertainty. As a result of the invasion, Brent oil prices rose above $130 a barrel for the first time since 2008. If Europe is to stop depending on Russian gas, additional investments totalling €270 billion in energy efficiency, renewable energy, and power networks would be required by 2030.

During the days before the invasion of Ukraine, in response to Russia's recognition of the Donetsk People's Republic and the Lugansk People's Republic, Germany blocked the Nord Stream 2 pipeline that was to deliver Russian gas to it. In late August, Gazprom gradually stopped delivering gas through the Nord Stream 1 pipeline as well, citing a leak and technical issues due to the European sanctions on Russia. On 26 September 2022, both pipelines of Nord Stream 1 and one of the two pipelines of Nord Stream 2 were destroyed by acts of sabotage by an as of September 2025 unidentified perpetrator.

== Disputes and diversification efforts ==
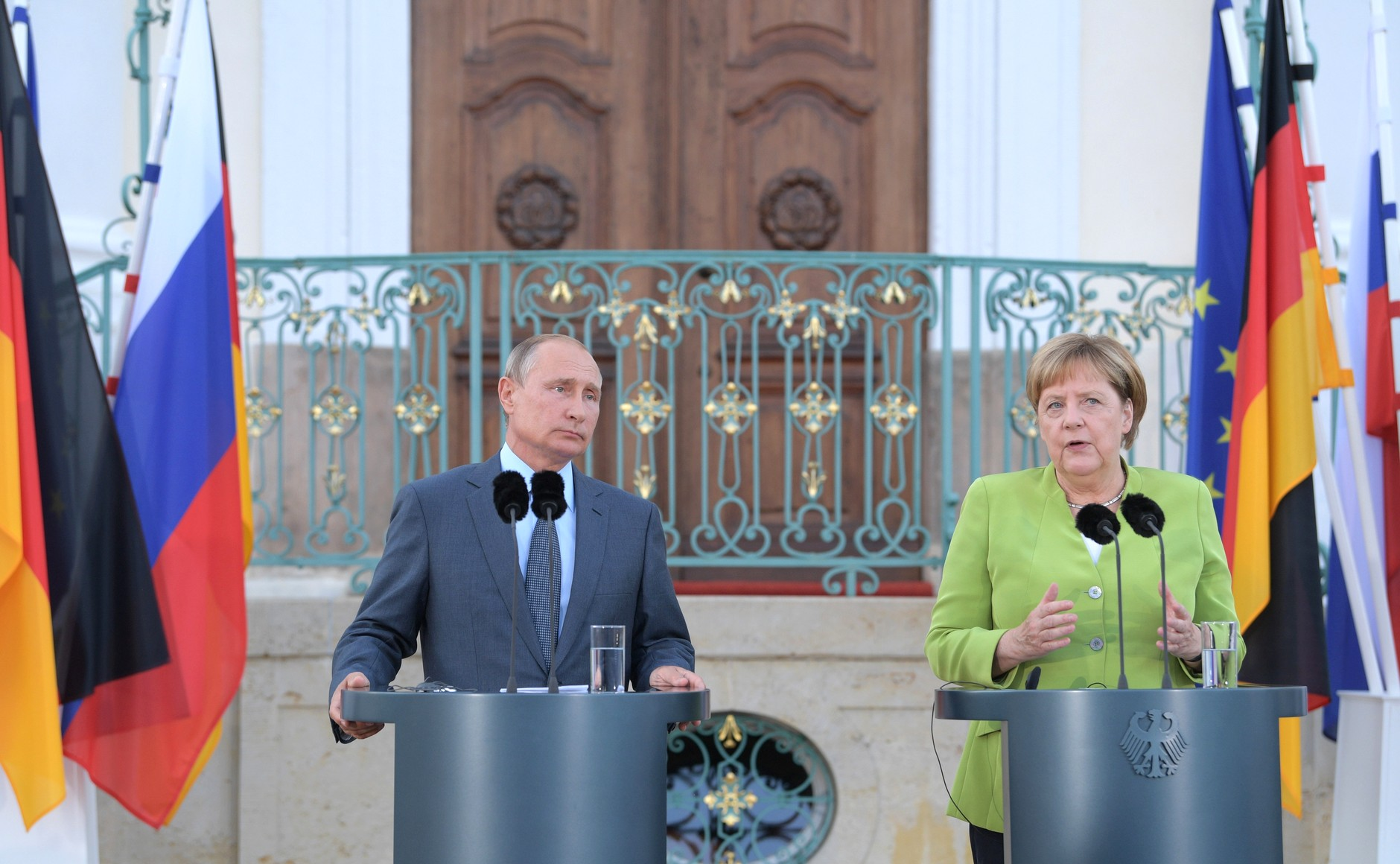
Angela Merkel criticized the United States's sanctions against Russia that target EU–Russia energy projects.

On the eve of the 2006 Riga summit, Senator Richard Lugar, head of the U.S. Senate's Foreign Relations Committee, declared that "the most likely source of armed conflict in the European theatre and the surrounding regions will be energy scarcity and manipulation." After that, the variety of national policies and stances of larger exporters versus larger dependents of Russian natural gas, together with the segmentation of the European natural gas market, became a prominent issue in European politics toward Russia, with significant geopolitical implications for economic and political ties between the EU and Russia.

These ties led to calls for greater European energy diversity, although such efforts are complicated by the fact that many European customers have long term legal contracts for gas deliveries despite the disputes, most of which stretch beyond 2025–2030.

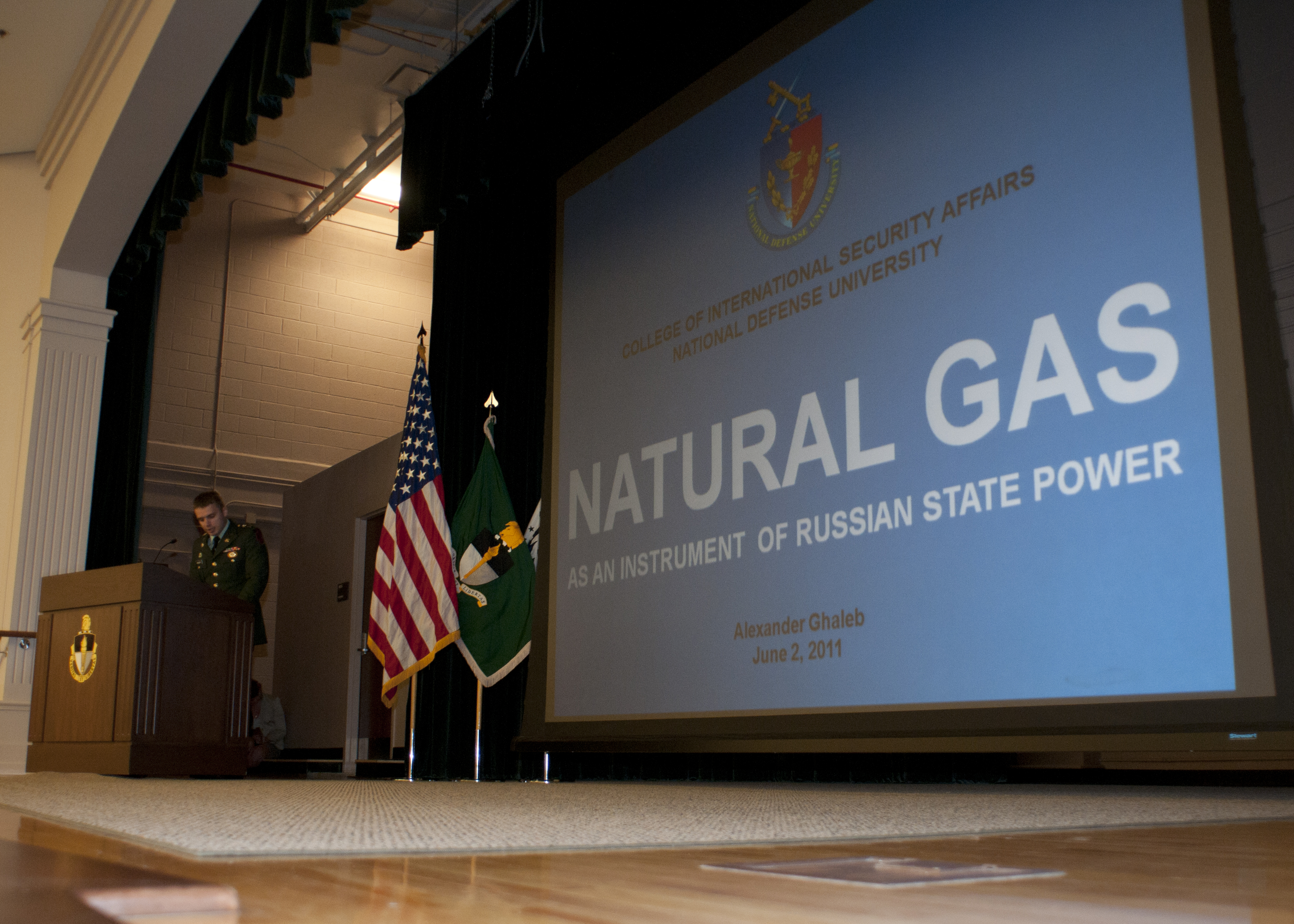
Natural gas presented as an instrument of Russian state power

A number of disputes over the natural gas prices in which Russia was using pipeline shutdowns in what was described as "tool for intimidation and blackmail" caused the European Union to significantly increase efforts to diversify its energy sources. Some even argued that Russia has developed "the capacity to use unilateral economic sanctions in the form of natural gas pricing and gas disruptions against many European North Atlantic Treaty Organization (NATO) member states". During an anti-trust investigation initiated in 2011 against Gazprom, a number of internal company documents were seized that documented a number of "abusive practices" in an attempt to "segment the internal [EU] market along national borders" and impose "unfair pricing".

Part of the aim of the Energy Union is to diversify the EU’s gas supplies away from Russia, which has already proved to be an unreliable partner, first in 2006 and then in 2009, and which threatened to become one again at the outbreak of the conflict in Ukraine in 2013–2014.

— European Council of Foreign Relations, 2015

The Nord Stream 2 gas pipeline from Russia to Germany was opposed by former Ukrainian President Petro Poroshenko, Polish Prime Minister Mateusz Morawiecki, former U.S. President Donald Trump and then British Foreign Secretary and later prime minister Boris Johnson. The United States has been encouraging European countries to diversify Russian-dominated energy supplies, with Qatar as possible alternative supplier.

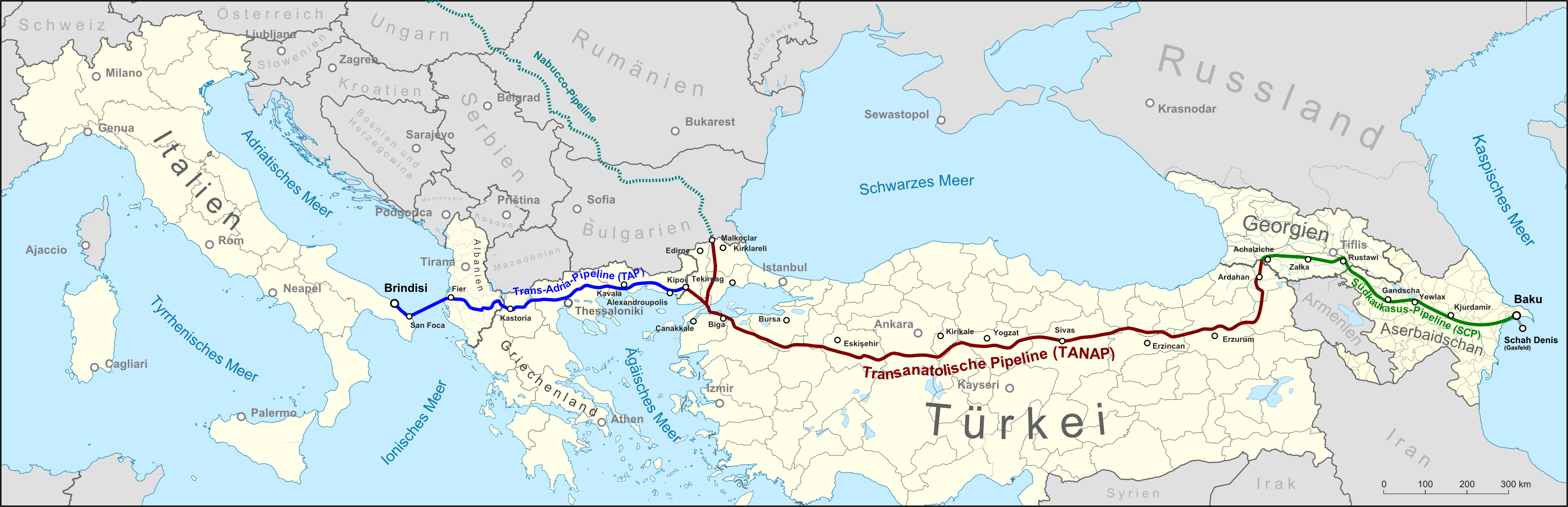
The Southern Gas Corridor, from Azerbaijan to Europe, aims to reduce Europe's dependency on Russian natural gas.

To compare with alternative sources, Germany produced 10.5% of its electricity from natural gas in 2019 and 8.6% (44 TWh) from renewable biomass, largely biogas. As only 13% of Germany's gas use was for power production, this replaced just above 1 percent of its overall gas consumption.

In January 2020 Russia temporarily halted oil deliveries to Belarus over another price dispute.

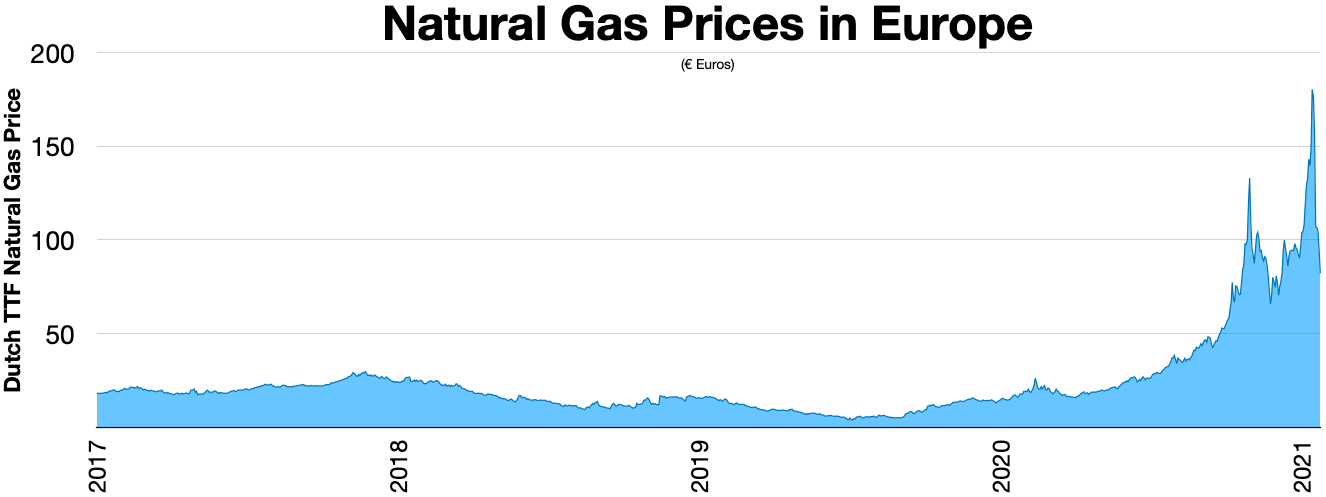
The price of natural gas in the European Union

Due to a combination of unfavourable conditions, which involved soaring demand of gas, less power generation by alternative sources, and cold winter that left European and Russian reserves depleted, Europe faced steep increases in gas prices in 2021. In August 2021 Russia reduced volumes of gas sent to European Union, which was seen by some analysts and politicians as an attempt to "support its case in starting flows via Nord Stream 2". The record-high prices in Europe were driven by a global surge in demand as the world quit the economic recession caused by COVID-19, particularly due to strong energy demand in Asia, as well as lowered supplies of natural gas from Russia to the European Union.

Russia has fully supplied on all long-term contracts, but has not supplied additional gas on the spot market. In October 2021, the Economist Intelligence Unit reported that Russia had limited extra gas export capacity because of high domestic requirements with production near its peak. In January–June Gazprom supplied about 22% more gas to Europe (including Turkey) in 2021 than the same months in 2020, and almost the same amount as in 2019. Algeria also increased supplies in 2021H1, but other countries supplied less than in 2020H1.

In September 2021 Russia announced that "rapid" start up of the newly completed Nord Stream 2 pipeline that had long been contested by various EU countries would resolve the problems. These statements were interpreted by some analysts as a "blackmail" attempt. 40 members of the European Parliament requested a legal inquiry into the Gazprom practices. In October 2021, Russian President Putin said that one of the factors influencing the prices was the termination of long-term supply contracts in favour of the spot market, while Gazprom announced it was accumulating "record" reserves of 72.6 billions m^{3} and continued record production at 847.9 millions m^{3} per day. On 27 October 2021, Putin ordered Gazprom to start pumping natural gas into European gas storage sites once Russia finished filling its own gas storage sites, by about 8 November.

The former Lithuanian Prime Minister Andrius Kubilius, who is European Parliament's rapporteur on relations with Russia, said it is "impossible" to have good relations with Russia and called for the EU to phase out its imports of oil and natural gas from Russia. A group of five EU member countries have called for joint action, such as group purchases.

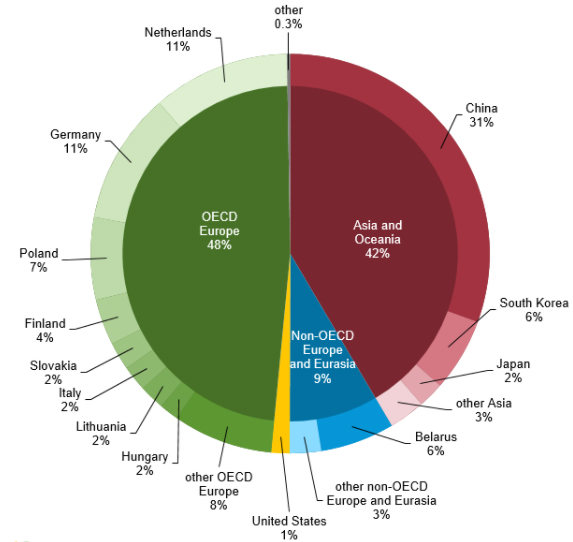
Russian oil exports by destination in 2020

On 7 March 2022, German chancellor Olaf Scholz and other European leaders pushed back against the call by the US and Ukraine to ban imports of Russian gas and oil because "Europe's supply of energy for heat generation, mobility, power supply and industry cannot be secured in any other way". However, the EU indicated that it would cut its gas dependency on Russia by two-thirds in 2022, and Germany stated that it would reduce its dependence on Russian energy imports by accelerating renewables and reaching 100% renewable energy generation by 2035.

Scholz announced plans to build two new LNG terminals. Economy Minister Robert Habeck said Germany reached a long-term energy partnership with Qatar, one of the world's largest exporters of liquefied natural gas,

In April 2022, Russia supplied 45% of EU's gas imports, earning $900 million a day. In the first two months after Russia invaded Ukraine, Russia earned $66.5 billion from fossil fuel exports, and the EU accounted for 71% of that trade. In May 2022, the European Commission proposed a ban on oil imports from Russia, part of the economic response to the 2022 Russian invasion of Ukraine. In May 2022, Russia imposed sanctions on European subsidiaries of Gazprom.

In June 2022, the United States government agreed to allow Italian company Eni and Spanish company Repsol to import oil from Venezuela to Europe to replace oil imports from Russia. French Finance Minister Bruno Le Maire said that France negotiated with the United Arab Emirates to replace some Russian oil imports. On 15 June 2022, Israel, Egypt and the European Union signed a trilateral natural gas agreement. In July 2022, the European Commission signed an agreement with Azerbaijan to increase natural gas imports.

With European policy-makers deciding to replace Russian fossil fuel imports with other fossil fuels imports and European coal energy production and to subsidize fossil fuel companies for reduced prices, as well as due to Russia being "a key supplier" of materials used for "clean energy technologies", the reactions to the war may also have an overall negative impact on the climate emissions pathway.

Due to the increasing scarcity and cost of fossil resources, Europe has been purchasing oil and liquefied gas from all over the world at any price. Faster than ever, new terminals and pipelines are being constructed. Germany, for instance, has offered to assist Senegal in the development of new gas reserves in exchange for the gas flowing to Europe.

In 2022, Turkish President Recep Tayyip Erdoğan and Russian President Vladimir Putin planned for Turkey to become an energy hub for all of Europe. According to Aura Săbăduș, a senior energy journalist focusing on the Black Sea region, "Turkey would accumulate gas from various producers — Russia, Iran and Azerbaijan, [liquefied natural gas] and its own Black Sea gas — and then whitewash it and relabel it as Turkish. European buyers wouldn’t know the origin of the gas."

On 2 September 2022, the G7 group of nations agreed to cap the price of Russian oil in order to reduce Russia's ability to finance its war with Ukraine without further increasing inflation. This was followed by the European Union on 6 October, when in its 8th round of sanctions agreed to price cap Russian oil imports (for Europe and third countries) with a price maximum to be set on 5 December 2022.

In September 2025, US President Donald Trump urged Europe to stop buying Russian oil.

In December 2025, the European Parliament adopted a legislative resolution to phase out Russian natural gas imports and strengthen monitoring of potential energy dependencies. The resolution sets a gradual ban on liquefied natural gas imports by the end of 2026 and pipeline gas imports by 30 September 2027, while also preparing for a phase-out of Russian oil imports by 2027. It establishes harmonised maximum penalties in case of infringements.

=== Poland ===
As part of Poland's plans to become fully energy independent from Russia within the next years, Piotr Wozniak, president of state-controlled oil and gas company PGNiG, stated in February 2019: "The strategy of the company is just to forget about Eastern suppliers and especially about Gazprom." In 2020, the Stockholm Arbitral Tribunal ruled that PGNiG's long-term contract gas price with Gazprom linked to oil prices should be changed to approximate the Western European gas market price, backdated to 1 November 2014 when PGNiG requested a price review under the contract.

Gazprom had to refund about $1.5 billion to PGNiG. The 1996 Yamal pipeline related contract is for up to 10.2 billion cubic metres of gas per year until it expires in 2022, with a minimum annual amount of 8.7 billion cubic metres. Following the 2021 global energy crisis, PGNiG made a further price review request on 28 October 2021. PGNiG stated the recent extraordinary increases in natural gas prices "provides a basis for renegotiating the price terms on which we purchase gas under the Yamal Contract."

On 17 November 2021 Belarus has stopped oil supplies over the Druzhba pipeline to Western Europe for "unscheduled maintenance" which happened amidst the Belarus border crisis and one day after Germany suspended certification of the Nord Stream 2 pipeline.

The Baltic Pipe between Norway and Poland will have the capacity to replace the roughly 60% of Polish gas imports coming from Russia via the Yamal pipeline, it went into operation on 27 September 2022, the day after the Nord Stream pipelines sabotage.

On 26 April 2022, Russia announced it would cut off natural gas exports to Poland and Bulgaria after Poland refused to pay for natural gas in rubles, which Russia demanded as a way to soften the effect of the sanctions that the EU imposed on it in response to the invasion of Ukraine.

== Electricity markets before the invasion of Ukraine ==
The turmoil in natural gas markets in 2021 and 2022 spilled over into European electricity markets, which typically rely on gas as a marginal fuel and are therefore affected when it experiences high prices and volatility. This has been exacerbated by lower than average hydropower output and lower nuclear output highlighting the need for adequate investment in sources of baseload supply and flexibility. While higher carbon prices have also played a role in pushing up electricity prices, it has not been the most significant factor. The International Energy Agency estimates that the effect on European electricity prices of the sharp spike in natural gas prices is nearly eight times bigger than the effect of the increase in carbon prices. Although wind power was unusually below average during the European summer, wind and solar PV provided valuable contributions to meeting European electricity demand in the fourth quarter of 2021. Wind power generation increased by 3% and solar by 20% compared with the same period a year earlier.

== Nuclear fuel supplies ==
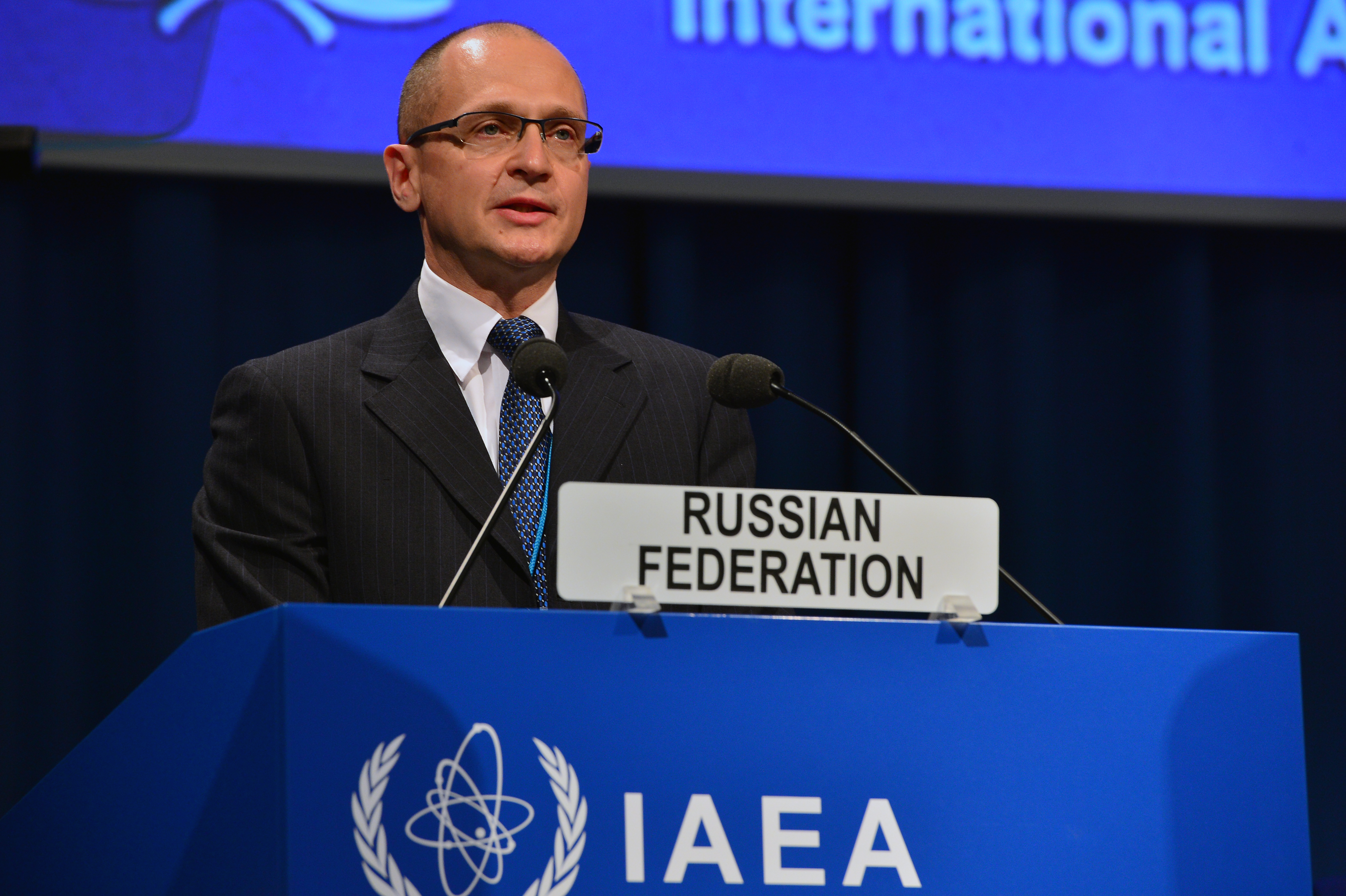
Sergey Kiriyenko, the head of state-owned nuclear corporation Rosatom from 2005 to 2016

Ukraine has been traditionally sourcing fuel for its nuclear power plants from Russia, although with the outbreak of war in Donbas in 2014, it saw an urgent need to at least diversify supplies of fuel and started talks with a number of Western suppliers, most notably Westinghouse branch in Sweden. In response, Russia started an intimidation campaign which included supplying deliberately incorrect technical specifications of the existing fuel supplies, alluding to "second Chernobyl" and staging protests in Kyiv. In spite of these efforts, Ukraine secured a number of framework contracts with numerous suppliers, eventually supplying 50% of the fuel from Russia and 50% from Sweden.

== See also ==
- Economy of Russia
- Energy in Russia
- Energy policy of Russia
- Natural gas in Russia
- Oil reserves in Russia
- Petroleum industry in Russia
- Nuclear power in Russia
- Foreign relations of Russia
- Russian influence operations
- European countries by fossil fuel use (% of total energy)
- European countries by electricity consumption per person
- List of countries by natural gas exports
- List of countries by natural gas proven reserves
- European Union and its Member States — Certain Measures Relating to the Energy Sector
- Energy Charter Treaty
- Russia–European Union relations
- Energy policy of the European Union
- Energy in Ukraine
- Energy in Poland
- Energy in Germany
- Centrex Europe Energy & Gas

== Sources ==
This article incorporates text from a free content work. Licensed under CC BY 4.0 (license statement/permission). Text taken from Gas Market and Russian Supply, International Energy Agency, the International Energy Agency.

This article incorporates text from a free content work. Licensed under CC BY 4.0 (license statement/permission). Text taken from Europe and the world needs to draw the right lessons from today's natural gas crisis, Fatih Birol, the International Energy Agency.

This article incorporates text from a free content work. Licensed under CC BY 4.0 (license statement/permission). Text taken from A 10-Point Plan to Reduce the European Union's Reliance on Russian Natural Gas, International Energy Agency, the International Energy Agency.

This article incorporates text from a free content work. Licensed under CC BY 4.0 (license statement/permission). Text taken from Critical minerals threaten a decades-long trend of cost declines for clean energy technologies, Kim Tae-Yoon, the International Energy Agency.
