= Falin-Kvitsinsky Doctrine =

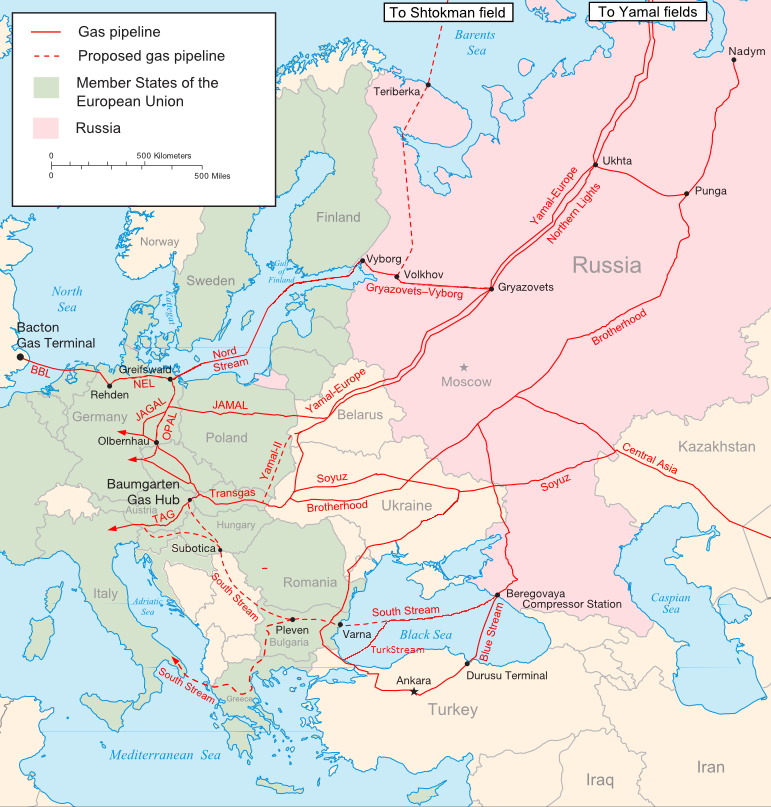
Russian Gas Pipelines into Europe

The Falin–Kvitsinsky doctrine was a political doctrine formulated in the Soviet Union at the end of the Cold War. The doctrine was based on the premise that as Soviet power declined within the Warsaw Pact countries, the traditional military influence of the Soviet Union in Eastern Europe could be replaced by a growing dependence on Russian supplies of natural gas and oil.

== Background ==
During the 1970s and 1980s, Russian gas exports to Europe grew as part of a buildup of energy infrastructure in the region. With the completion of the Brotherhood pipeline in 1984, and the transnational Yamal pipeline shortly after, the transmission of gas to Eastern Europe was rapidly expanded. This, combined with the broad expansion of oil pipelines, laid the framework for control in the region. By the late 1980s, crude oil and natural gas were the largest Russian exports, making it a critical part of the economy.

== History ==
In 1989 as the Soviet fall of power became a threat, deputy foreign minister Yuli Kvitsinsky, together with the Chief of the International Department of the Central Committee of the Communist Party of the Soviet Union, Valentin Falin, formulated the frameworks for the Falin-Kvitsinsky doctrine. The doctrine assumes that the military influence of the Soviet Union within the Warsaw Pact countries would not be sustained against the declining economy of the USSR, and should be replaced with the dependence of the countries on Soviet oil and gas. Since the energy industry appeared to be the foundation in a long process of rebuilding Russia's position as a superpower on the international scene, it became a principal tool of influence within the foreign policy agenda.

By 1991, the Soviet leadership finalized this strategy, with the ideas laid out in the Falin-Kvitsinsky doctrine playing a central role. The final document, which was aimed at the Finlandization of Central and Eastern Europe, aimed to force concessions out of countries to avoid direct confrontation. The doctrine's implementation was attempted shortly after during negotiations with Poland, Czechoslovakia, and Hungary, and proposed free military transit through the territories. Russia also proposed to prohibit them from joining in any alliances that would have a negative impact on the group of countries. The doctrine accused the West of ‘ousting’ Russia from the region in which Russia had essential strategic interests, including both natural resources and military power.

Despite the collapse of the Soviet Union at the end of 1991, many countries of the former Warsaw Pact remained dependent on the Russian supply of energy resources. At the time, Russia's relationship with Eastern European countries was taking a backseat to domestic and foreign issues that were perceived as higher priority. This included a faltering economy domestically and a push to democratize and form a working relationship with the United States. Russia hoped to indirectly prevent Eastern Europe from becoming a buffer between Europe and the Western world, and control over energy resources was both strong for the economy and the doctrine's ideas. Fears of Russian revisionism and the Russian Federation's treatment of energy resources as political weapons, for example, through the natural gas pipeline Nord Stream 2, have led the countries of the region to take certain measures. Russia has the largest production of natural gas in the world, and oil production by Russia has increased drastically, especially over the early-2000s, which has led to a continued dependency on Russia for energy resources. By 2010, Eastern Europe was more dependent than ever on Russian gas resources. Belarus, Estonia, Lithuania, Latvia, Moldova, and Slovakia imported 100% of their natural gas from Russia, while Austria, Bulgaria, the Czech Republic, Greece, Poland, Slovenia, Hungary and Ukraine were more than 50% reliant.

== Impact and Influence on the Ukraine–Russia War ==
About 80% of the natural gas that Russia exports to Western Europe goes through the territory of Ukraine. This has incentivized Russia to continue influencing the political agenda of the country and other former Warsaw Pact countries. Russia used its natural gas resources to pressure Ukraine from 2004 to 2006 as part of its response to Ukraine's pro-Western shifts, increasing prices from $80 per 1,000 cubic meters to roughly $230 per 1,000 cubic meters. In 2013, Ukraine, under the influence of then-President Viktor Yanukovych, was persuaded to pull out of the European Union Association Agreement in exchange for a reduction in Natural Gas prices. In 2021, Russia began reducing gas supplies to Europe ahead of the invasion, hoping to create energy instability in the region. Following their first territorial gains in 2022, Russia halted gas supplies to Bulgaria, Poland and the Netherlands for not paying in roubles to shield the country from sanctions. Similarly, following Finland's application to join NATO, Russia stopped providing natural gas to the country. Russia has also reduced gas exports to Germany and Italy without offering an explanation.

Russia believed that energy dependence by Ukraine's European neighbors would prevent aid and support to Ukraine. However, countries such as Belarus, Estonia, Latvia, Lithuania and Poland were able to diversify the sources of their natural gas supplies quicker than expected after the conflict began in 2022. Following the 2022 Russian invasion of Ukraine, Russia halted gas supplies to Bulgaria, Poland and the Netherlands for not paying in rubles to shield the country from Western sanctions. Similarly, following Finland's application to join NATO, Russia stopped providing natural gas to the country. Russia has also reduced gas exports to Germany and Italy without offering an explanation.

Shortly after the invasion, Ukraine requested an emergency synchronisation with the European Transmission System Operators (TSOs), integrating parts of the Ukrainian Electric grid away from Russia and to the larger European system. Trade drastically increased in the following years, providing relief during the war. Most recently, the construction of a more decentralized grid has begun in the western part of the country.

The International Energy Agency (IEA) reported a decrease of 267 million barrels of petroleum from global reserves in 2022, aiding shortages across Ukraine and Europe. However, widespread disruptions to infrastructure remain. Ukraine’s district heating network, which provides centralized hot water and space heating in large cities has been a central target of the Russian military since the invasion began. Damage to critical energy infrastructure has also become a central part of the strategy, remaining a persistent challenge to Ukraine throughout the conflict. Long term consequences on the energy security of Ukraine and Eastern Europe remain uncertain, reflecting longstanding patterns in Russia's use of energy resources as instruments of foreign policy influence.

== See also ==
- Energy policy of the Soviet Union
- Petroleum industry in Russia
- Natural gas in Russia
- Russia in the European energy sector
- 2022 Russia–European Union gas dispute
