= Energy policy of the Soviet Union =

The energy policy of the Soviet Union was an important feature of the country's planned economy from the time of Lenin (head of government until 1924) onward. The Soviet Union was virtually self-sufficient in energy; major development of the energy sector started with Stalin's autarky policy of the 1920s. During the country's 70 years of existence (1922–1991), it primarily secured economic growth based on large inputs of natural resources. But by the 1960s this method had become less efficient. In contrast to other nations who shared the same experience, technological innovation was not strong enough to replace the energy sector in importance.

During the later years of the Soviet Union, most notably during the Brezhnev stagnation era (c. 1975–1985), Soviet authorities exploited fuel resources from inhospitable areas, notably Siberia and the Far East. Construction of industry in these locations required massive input by the Soviet régime. Energy resources remained the backbone of the Soviet economy in the 1970s, as seen during the 1973 oil crisis, which put a premium on Soviet energy resources. High prices for energy resources in the aftermath of the 1973 oil crisis led the Soviet authorities to engage more actively in foreign trade with first-world countries, particularly Europe (natural gas) and Japan (oil). In exchange for energy resources, the Soviet Union would receive first-world technological developments. So, despite its overall stagnation, the Soviet Union under Leonid Brezhnev (General Secretary from 1964 to 1982) moved from being an autarkic economy to a country trying to integrate into the world market.

During its existence, the Soviet Union, when compared to any other country, had the largest supply of untapped energy resources within its borders. Total energy-production grew from 10.25 million barrels per day of oil equivalent (mbdoe) in 1960 to 27.58 million barrels per day of oil equivalent (mbdoe) in 1980. Production and exports for the Soviet Union did not keep growing as Soviet planners anticipated. During the late-1950s, mining activity shifted from European Russia to Eastern Russia for more mineable resources. The increased distances between mines and coal-shipping ports decreased the efficiency of coal exports. Furthermore, the USSR struggled to transport its Eastern resources to its Western side for later consumption and exportation.

Policy used by the Soviet leadership to direct energy resources was vital to the military and economic success of the country. Stagnation in Soviet energy production directly affected Eastern Europe's energy supplies. The policy acted on in the USSR affected the Soviet satellite-nations and - to a lesser extent - the entire world. The political maneuvers used by the USSR with regard to energy exports would come to be mirrored by the Russian Federation government to follow after 1991.

== A historical perspective ==
=== Under Lenin (1918-1923) ===
- See also New Economic Policy

Within Gosplan, the Soviet Economic planning bureau, there were two divisions directly involved with this topic. One was focused on Electrification and Energy, GOELRO Another was focused on Fuels. The focus of the Soviets on energy and especially electrification in early years is often attributed to Lenin's famous line that "Communism is Soviet power plus electrification for the whole country.".

=== Under Stalin before World War II (1924-1940) ===
- 1928 Stalin's first five-year plan

Despite many of the targets being unbelievably high (a 250% increase in overall industrial development, with a 330% percent expansion in heavy industry), remarkable results were achieved:

- Coal: 64.3 million tons (compared to 35.4 million tons in 1928, and a prescribed target of 68.0 million tons)
- Oil: 21.4 million tons (compared to 11.7 million tons in 1928, and a prescribed target of 19.0 million tons)
- Electricity: 13.4 billion kWh (compared to 5.0 billion kWh in 1928, and a target of 17.0 billion kWh)

=== During World War II (1941-1945) ===
- Lend Lease & the Amtorg Trading Corporation

== By energy sector ==
=== Electricity ===
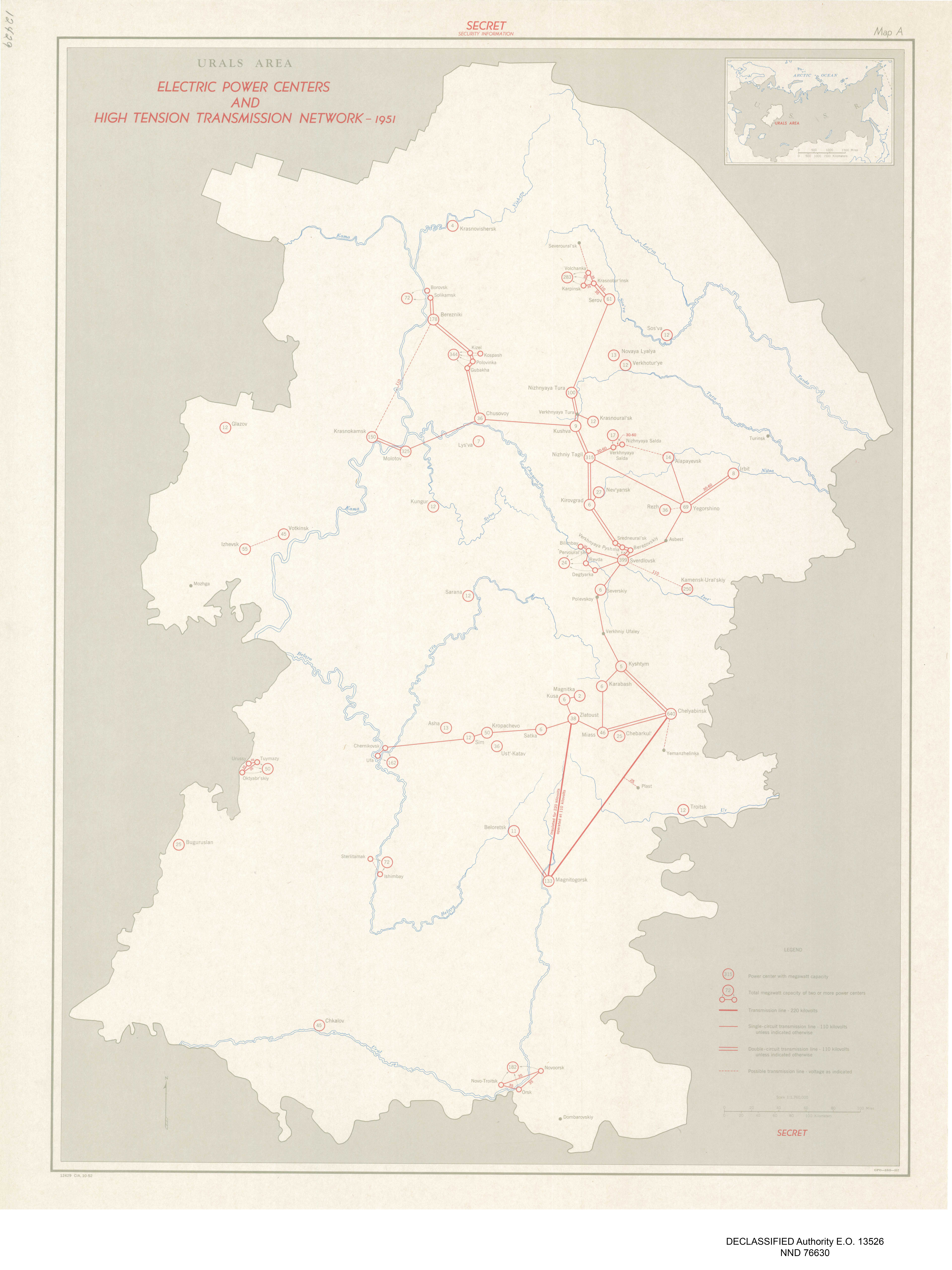
Map of transmission lines in the Urals region, 1951

Electrification of the country was a focus of the Soviet Union's first economic plan (GOELRO plan).

=== Oil/petroleum ===
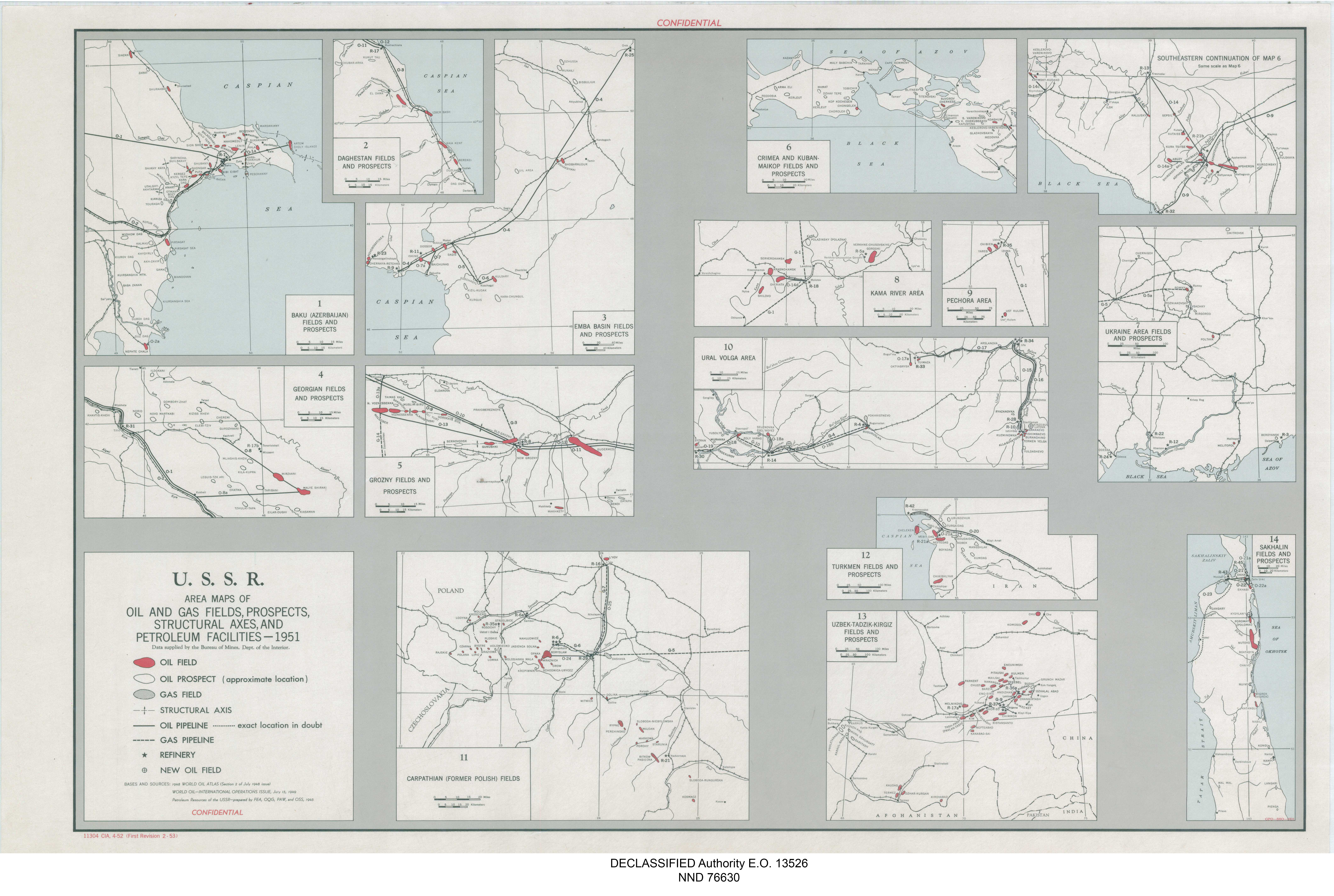
United States CIA map of pipeline infrastructure in the Soviet Union (1951)

Within the USSR State Planning Committee (Gosplan), there was a State Committee for the Oil Industry which handled this area of the economy.

=== Natural gas ===
A separate Soviet gas industry was created in 1943. Large natural gas reserves discovered in Siberia and the Ural and Volga regions in the 1970s and 1980s enabled the Soviet Union to become a major gas producer. Gas exploration, development, and distribution were centralized in the Ministry of Gas Industry, which was created in 1965.

See also Gazprom.

=== Hydroelectric ===
- See also Dnieper Hydroelectric Station
- Hydroelectric power stations built in the Soviet Union

== Stagnation of the USSR Energy Industry ==
From the early-1960s to the mid-1970s energy production, consumption, and net exports increased for the Soviet Union. Growth in energy demand had reached a stable pace comparable to that of Western Nations of the time. In the late-1970s, both coal and oil production began to stagnate. This continued into the 1980s. By end of the Cold War, Soviet leadership formulated Falin-Kvitsinsky Doctrine which assumed that the military influence of the Soviet Union within the Warsaw Pact countries would not be sustained against the declining economy of the USSR, and should be replaced with the dependence of the countries on Soviet oil and gas.

The USSR also suffered from a lack of demand by capitalist nations and their previous colonial holdings in developing countries. This dynamic changed upon the completion of the USSR natural gas pipeline from Western Siberia to Germany. This created an efficient and effective route to transport liquefied natural gas (LNG). Seeing the political influence that the Soviet Union would gain over Western Europe, President Reagan attempted to stop this project but failed. Nevertheless, the overall growth rate of Soviet energy production and consumption steadily declined post-1975. This difficulty came from the supply-side.

== Policy Guiding Industry ==
The Politburo, or the main policy-making group in the Soviet Union, provided policy-makers a general outline to guide national policy. This group consisted of top Soviet Leaders and was headed by the General Secretary. This ‘big picture’ scope was then taken up by the Ministries and Committees involved in economic development and all the major industries within the USSR. These groups worked with the enterprises that actually carried out the resource production in order to form operational goals for them. This conversion from conceptual to exact directives was not always effective at providing the appropriate remedy when problems arose.

A lot of the issues in stagnation began with faulty planning. Policies that led to the large-scale implementation of techniques such a water-flooding reservoirs had initial benefits and were administratively efficient. In the short-term, this approach was effective and increased recovery rates for USSR reservoirs above American reservoirs, but caused issues later in the life-cycle of the sites. Since companies could not go bankrupt in the Soviet planned economy, subsidies and losses were covered by the state. The lack of winners and losers amongst Soviet companies led to a pattern of USSR enterprises lacking innovation in drilling techniques. This was effective on a domestic scale, but not when compared to the efficiency of international competitors.

== USSR Policy Guiding Russia ==
Both the USSR and Russia (under Vladimir Putin), have cancelled exports of energy supplies to buyers who have gone against national objectives. In recent years, Putin has put forward diction on the dependability of Russian natural gas. Nevertheless, Russia's power in the international arena correlates to the demand for the resources that it delivers.

Much of the Russian economy went through uncertainty following the end of the Soviet Union. This was not true for the Natural Gas Industry. The Ministry of the Gas Industry was converted into the company Gazprom in 1989 and Viktor Chernomyrdin, the former Minister, became CEO. This political decision was not accepted easily. The Natural Gas Ministry officials fought hard to get this movement approved whereas the Petroleum Ministry failed to stay intact post-1989.

Russia has the largest production of natural gas in the world. Oil production by Russia has increased dramatically, especially over the early-2000s. This has led to a continued dependency on Russia for energy resources, by previous satellite countries. About 80% of the natural gas that Russia exports to Western Europe goes through Ukrainian territory. This has incentivized Russia to continue influencing the political agenda of Ukraine and other former republics of the USSR.

== See also ==
- Energy policy of Russia
