= European Union and its Member States — Certain Measures Relating to the Energy Sector =

European Union and its Member States — Certain Measures Relating to the Energy Sector, DS476, is the formal name of a case brought by the Russian Federation against the European Union and its member states in the World Trade Organization's Dispute Settlement Body.

The case was formally initiated with the filing of a complaint by Russia (in WTO terms, a "request for consultations") on April 30, 2014. The dispute concerns the EU's Third Energy Package, which consists of various two EU directives and EU regulations.

Russia claims that the measures within the package violate Articles II, VI, XVI and XVII of the General Agreement on Trade in Services (GATS); Articles I, III, X and XI of the 1994 General Agreement on Tariffs and Trade (GATT); Article 3 of the Agreement on Subsidies and Countervailing Measures (SCM); and Article 2 of the Agreement on Trade Related Investment Measures (TRIM).

== History of the dispute and background ==
The European Commission adopted the Third Energy Package, which came into effect in 2009. The measures aimed to promoted a more competitive European Union-wide market in the energy sector. One provision in the package prohibits energy suppliers from also owning distribution networks, including pipelines.

The new rules were opposed by Russia and its state-owned enterprise Gazprom, which supplies more than 25% of Europe's gas by transnational pipelines, and is the sole supplier of case for several EU member states, mostly Eastern European nations that were formerly part of the Soviet bloc. Russia considered filing a challenge to the Third Energy Package as early as November 2011.

The filing of the complaint in 2014 is viewed as part of a wider decline in relations between Russia and the EU, occurring simultaneously with tensions over the Russian occupation of Crimea and other Russian involvement in Ukraine. Russia previously filed an anti-dumping complaint against the EU in the WTO, while the EU filed a complaint against Russia in the WTO over its ban on imported pork products and a separate complaint over Russia's "recycling fee" for vehicles, which the EU argues is a protectionist policy that favors Russia, Belarus, and Kazakhstan, the three members of the Russian-led Eurasian Customs Union,.

At an April 2014 meeting of the WTO Council for Trade in Goods, for example, Angelos Pangratis, the EU ambassador to the WTO, stated: "The overall experience with Russia as WTO member is, to our regrets, rather disappointing. Russia has not shown willingness to put its trade measures in line with basic WTO obligations and has continued raising a number of trade obstacles inconsistent with its WTO obligations."

== See also ==
- Dispute settlement in the World Trade Organization
- Nord Stream 1
- South Stream Pipeline
- Russia in the European energy sector
- Russia–European Union relations
- Russia–Ukraine gas disputes
