= REPowerEU Gas Regulation =

European Union regulation

Regulation (EU) 2026/261
- European Union regulation
- Title: Regulation (EU) 2026/261 of the European Parliament and of the Council of 26 January 2026 on phasing out Russian natural gas imports and preparing the phase-out of Russian oil imports, improving monitoring of potential energy dependencies and amending Regulation (EU) 2017/1938
- Made by: European Parliament & Council of the European Union
- Made under: Art. 194(2) & 207 TFEU
- Journal reference: OJ L, 2026/261, 2.2.2026

History
- Date made: 26 January 2026
- Entry into force: 3 February 2026

Other legislation
- Amends: Regulation (EU) 2017/1938

Regulation (EU) 2026/261 or REPowerEU Gas Regulation is a European Union regulation on phasing out Russian natural gas imports to the European Union adopted in 2026. The regulation sets a timetable whereby imports of Russian liquefied natural gas (LNG) into the EU will be prohibited by the end of 2026 and imports of pipeline gas by September 2027.

== Background ==
Following the Russian invasion of Ukraine in 2022, the EU member state heads of state and government committed in the Versailles Declaration of March 2022 to phase out European dependency on Russian fossil fuels, including natural gas. To implement this commitment, the European Commission proposed the REPowerEU strategy to improve energy security and diversification in May 2022. At the time, Russia was the European Union's largest external supplier of natural gas.

As of October 2025, Russia accounted for 12% of EU gas imports, down from 45% before its 2022 invasion of Ukraine. Several EU member states, including Hungary, Slovakia, Belgium and France, continued to import Russian gas under existing contracts.

== Provisions ==
The legislative resolution includes a prohibition on most imports of Russian natural gas, including both liquefied natural gas (LNG) and pipeline gas. Spot-market LNG will be banned once the regulation enters into force by the end of 2026, with phased-out pipeline supplies by 30 September 2027. It also noted the Commission's plans to propose legislation in early 2026 to phase out Russian oil imports.

A prior authorization system was introduced to verify the origin of gas imports and prevent circumvention.

== Legislative history ==
On 17 June 2025, the European Commission submitted a proposal for a regulation to phase out imports of Russian pipeline gas and liquefied natural gas.

The proposal was examined in the Parliament by the Committee on International Trade and the Committee on Industry, Research and Energy, with the Committee on the Internal Market and Consumer Protection providing an opinion. National parliaments and EU advisory bodies, such as the European Economic and Social Committee, were also consulted. MEPs Ville Niinistö (Greens/EFA) and Inese Vaidere (EPP) served as rapporteurs for the proposal.

First reading in the European Parliament
Ballot →	17 December 2025
Required majority →	327 out of 652
Yes: • EPP (169); • S&D (120); • Renew (68); • ECR (68); • Greens/EFA (47); • The Left (19); • NA (2); • ESN (2); • PfE (2)	500 / 718
No: • PfE (61); • NA (21); • ESN (20); • The Left (16); • ECR (2)	120 / 718
Abstention: • PfE (15); • The Left (7); • ECR (4); • S&D (3); • Greens/EFA (1); • NA (1); • ESN (1)	32 / 718
Not voting: • EPP (19); • S&D (13); • PfE (7); • Renew (7); • ECR (5); • Greens/EFA (5); • The Left (4); • NA (4); • ESN (3)	67 / 733
Result →	Approved

A compromise between the European Parliament and the Council was reached in early December. On 17 December 2025, the Parliament adopted its position at first reading on the text, and forwarded it to the Council. MEPs cast 500 votes in favour, 120 against, and 32 absteined. The majority of support came from the EPP, S&D, Renew, Greens/EFA, and most of the ECR. Opposition and abstentions came primarily from Eurosceptic and pro-Russian groups, such as the PfE, the ESN, and some members of The Left, which have historically favored maintaining energy ties with Russia.

The Council approved the regulation by qualified majority on 26 January 2026. Representatives of Hungary and Slovakia voted against it, while Bulgaria abstained. The regulation was signed into law by Roberta Metsola and Marilena Raouna on the same day.
