= Yulia Tymoshenko =

Prime Minister of Ukraine (2005, 2007–2010)

- Юлія Тимошенко
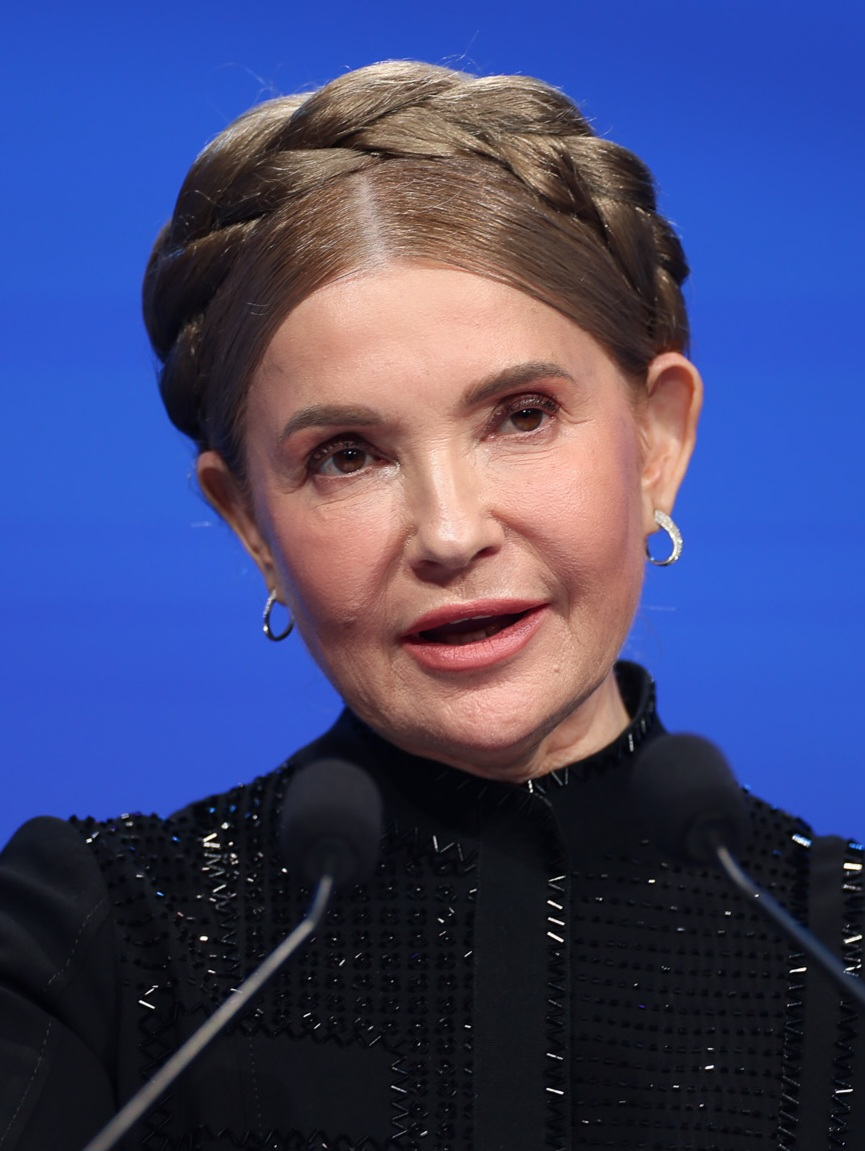
- Tymoshenko in 2025

Prime Minister of Ukraine
- In office 18 December 2007 – 4 March 2010
- President: Viktor Yushchenko; Viktor Yanukovych
- Deputy: Oleksandr Turchynov
- Preceded by: Viktor Yanukovych
- Succeeded by: Oleksandr Turchynov (acting)
- In office 24 January 2005 (Note: Acting: 24 January 2005 – 4 February 2005) – 8 September 2005
- President: Viktor Yushchenko
- Deputy: Anatoliy Kinakh
- Preceded by: Mykola Azarov (acting)
- Succeeded by: Yuriy Yekhanurov

Deputy Prime Minister for Energy and Coal Mining
- In office 30 December 1999 – 19 January 2001
- President: Leonid Kuchma
- Prime Minister: Viktor Yushchenko

People's Deputy of Ukraine
- Incumbent
- Assumed office 27 November 2014
- In office 23 November 2007 – 19 December 2007; 25 May 2006 – 14 June 2007; 14 May 2002 – 4 February 2005; 16 January 1997 – 2 March 2000

Personal details
- Born: Yulia Volodymyrivna Hrihyan; 27 November 1960 (age 65) Dnipropetrovsk, Ukrainian SSR, Soviet Union
- Party: Batkivshchyna (since 1999)
- Other political affiliations: Hromada (1997–1999); Yulia Tymoshenko Bloc (2001–2012); Dictatorship Resistance Committee (2011–2014)
- Spouse: Oleksandr Tymoshenko (m. 1979)
- Children: Eugenia Tymoshenko
- Education: National Mining University of Ukraine; Dnipropetrovsk National University; Kyiv National Economic University
- Website: tymoshenko.ua/en (archived)

Yulia Volodymyrivna Tymoshenko (Note: In this name that follows East Slavic naming customs, the patronymic is Volodymyrivna and the family name is Hrihyan.) (Note: Ukrainian: Юлія Володимирівна Тимошенко, IPA: [ˈjul⁽ʲ⁾ijɐ woloˈdɪmɪr⁽ʲ⁾iu̯nɐ tɪmoˈʃɛnko]) (née Hrihyan; (Note: Ukrainian: Грігян) born 27 November 1960) is a Ukrainian politician, who served as Prime Minister of Ukraine in 2005, and again from 2007 until 2010; the first woman in Ukraine to hold that position. She has been a member of the Verkhovna Rada as People's Deputy of Ukraine several times between 1997 and 2007, and presently as of 2014, and was First Deputy Prime Minister of Ukraine for the fuel and energy complex from 1999 to 2001. She holds a PhD degree in Economic Sciences, which is known in Ukraine and other countries as a "Candidate of Sciences" degree.

Tymoshenko is the leader of the Batkivshchyna (Ukrainian: Батьківщина) political party. She supports Ukraine's integration into the European Union and strongly opposes the membership of Ukraine in the Russia-led Eurasian Customs Union. She supports NATO membership for Ukraine.

She co-led the Orange Revolution and was the first woman twice appointed and endorsed by parliamentary majority to become prime minister, serving from 24 January to 8 September 2005, and again from 18 December 2007 to 4 March 2010. She placed third in Forbes magazine's list of the world's most powerful women in 2005.

Tymoshenko finished second in the 2010 Ukrainian presidential election runoff, losing by 3.5 percentage points to the winner, Viktor Yanukovych. From 2011 to 2014, she was detained due to a criminal case that was seen by many as politically motivated persecution by President Yanukovych, but after the Revolution of Dignity she was rehabilitated by the Supreme Court of Ukraine and the European Court of Human Rights. In the concluding days of the Revolution of Dignity, she was released after three years in jail. She again finished second in the 2014 Ukrainian presidential election, this time to Petro Poroshenko. After being a heavy favorite in the polls for several years, she came third in the first round of the 2019 Ukrainian presidential election, receiving 13.40% of the vote, thus failing to qualify for the second round.

Re-elected to Ukraine's parliament in 2019, she led her party in opposition.

== Early life and career ==
Tymoshenko was born Yulia Hrihyan on 27 November 1960, in Dnipropetrovsk, Ukrainian SSR, Soviet Union. Her mother, Lyudmila Telehina (née Nelepova), was born on 11 August 1937, also in Dnipropetrovsk. Yulia's father, Volodymyr Hrihyan, who according to his Soviet Union passport was Latvian, was born on 3 December 1937, also in Dnipropetrovsk. He abandoned his wife and young daughter when Yulia was between one and three years old; Yulia used her mother's surname.

=== Education ===
In 1977, Tymoshenko graduated from high school No. 75 in Dnipropetrovsk. In 1978, Tymoshenko was enrolled in the Automatization and Telemechanics Department of the Dnipropetrovsk Mining Institute. In 1979, she transferred to the Economics Department of the Dnipropetrovsk State University, majoring in cybernetic engineering and graduating in 1984 with first degree honors as an engineer-economist.

In 1999, she defended her PhD dissertation, titled State Regulation of the tax system, at the Kyiv National Economic University and received a Ph.D. in economics.

=== Commercial career ===
Tymoshenko has worked as a practicing economist and academic. Prior to her political career, she became a successful but controversial businesswoman in the gas industry, becoming by some estimates one of the richest people in the country. Before becoming Ukraine's first female prime minister in 2005, Tymoshenko co-led the Orange Revolution. She was placed third in Forbes magazine's List of The World's 100 Most Powerful Women 2005.

After graduating from the Dnipropetrovsk State University in 1984, Tymoshenko worked as an engineer-economist in the "Dnipro Machine-Building Plant" (which produced missiles) in Dnipropetrovsk until 1988.

In 1988, as part of the perestroika initiatives, Yulia and Oleksandr Tymoshenko borrowed 5,000 roubles and opened a video-rental cooperative, perhaps with the help of Oleksander's father, Gennadi Tymoshenko, who presided over a regional film-distribution network in the provincial council.

From 1989 to 1991, Yulia and Oleksandr Tymoshenko founded and led a commercial video-rental company "Terminal" in Dnipropetrovsk.

In 1991, Tymoshenko established (jointly with her husband Oleksandr, Gennadi Tymoshenko, and Olexandr Gravets) "The Ukrainian Petrol Corporation", a company that supplied the agriculture industry of Dnipropetrovsk with fuel from 1991 to 1995. Tymoshenko worked as a general director. In 1995, this company was reorganized into United Energy Systems of Ukraine. Tymoshenko served as the president of United Energy Systems of Ukraine, a privately owned middleman company that became the main importer of Russian natural gas to Ukraine, from 1995 to 1 January 1997. During that time she was nicknamed the "gas princess". She was also accused of "having given Pavlo Lazarenko kickbacks in exchange for her company's stranglehold on the country's gas supplies", although Judge Martin Jenkins of the United States District Court for the Northern District of California, on 7 May 2004, dismissed the allegations of money laundering and conspiracy regarding UESU, Somoli Ent. et al. (companies affiliated with Yulia Tymoshenko) in connection with Lazarenko's activities. During this period, Tymoshenko was involved in business relations (either co-operative or hostile) with many important figures of Ukraine. Tymoshenko also had to deal with the management of the Russian corporation, Gazprom. Tymoshenko claims that, under her management, UESU successfully solved significant economic problems: from 1995 to 1997, Ukraine's multi-billion debt for Russian natural gas was paid; Ukraine resumed international cooperation in machine building, the pipe industry and construction; and Ukraine's export of goods to Russia doubled. In the period of 1995 to 1997, Tymoshenko was considered one of the richest business people in Ukraine. When Tymoshenko made her initial foray into national politics, her company became an instrument of political pressure on her and on her family. UESU top management faced prosecution. Since 1998, Tymoshenko has been a prominent politician in Ukraine. She was not included in the list of "100 richest Ukrainians" in 2006.

== Political career ==
=== Early career ===
==== Election to parliament ====
Tymoshenko entered politics in 1996, when she was elected to the Verkhovna Rada (the Ukrainian parliament) in constituency No. 229, Bobrynets, Kirovohrad Oblast, winning a record 92.3% of the vote. In Parliament, Tymoshenko joined the Constitutional Centre faction. In February 1997 this centrists faction was 56 lawmakers strong and, according to Ukrainska Pravda, at first it supported the policies of Ukrainian President Leonid Kuchma. In late 1997, Tymoshenko called for impeachment and the next Ukrainian Presidential elections to be held not in 1999, but in the fall of 1998. In late November 1997, the General Prosecutor of Ukraine asked the Verkhovna Rada to lift Tymoshenko's parliamentary immunity, but the deputies voted against it.

Tymoshenko was re-elected in 1998, winning a constituency in the Kirovohrad Oblast, and was also number six on the party list of Hromada. She became an influential person in the parliament, and was appointed the Chair of the Budget Committee of the Verkhovna Rada. After Hromada's party leader Pavlo Lazarenko fled to the United States in February 1999 to avoid investigations for embezzlement, various faction members left Hromada to join other parliamentary factions, among them Tymoshenko, who set up the All-Ukrainian Union "Fatherland" faction in March 1999 in protest against the methods of Lazarenko. "Fatherland" was officially registered as a political party in September 1999, and began to attract the voters who had voted for Yevhen Marchuk in the October 1999 presidential election. In 2000, "Fatherland" went in opposition to President Kuchma.

==== Deputy Prime Minister for fuel and energy ====
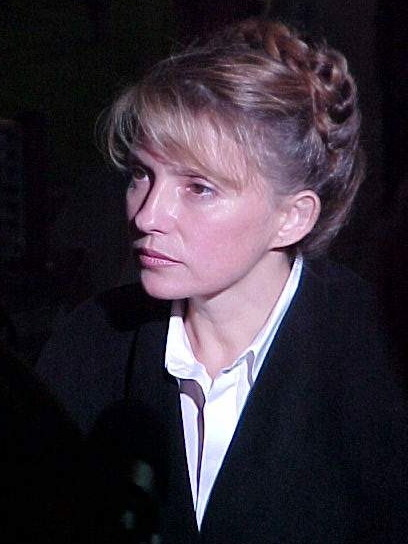
Yulia Tymoshenko in 2002

From late December 1999 to January 2001, Tymoshenko was the Deputy Prime Minister for the fuel and energy sector in the cabinet of Viktor Yushchenko. She officially left parliament on 2 March 2000. Under her guidance, Ukraine's revenue collections from the electricity industry grew by several thousand percent. She scrapped the practice of barter in the electricity market, requiring industrial customers to pay for their electricity in cash. She also terminated exemptions for many organizations which excluded them from having their power disconnected. Her reforms meant that the government had sufficient funds to pay civil servants and increase salaries. In 2000, Tymoshenko's government provided an additional 18 billion hryvna for social payments. Half of this amount was collected due to withdrawal of funds from shadow schemes, the ban on barter payments and the introduction of competition rules to the energy market.

On 18 August 2000, her husband Oleksandr Tymoshenko, CEO of United Energy Systems of Ukraine (UESU), was detained and arrested. Tymoshenko herself stated that her husband's arrest was the result of political pressure on her. On 19 January 2001, Kuchma ordered Tymoshenko to be dismissed. Then, Yushchenko silently accepted her dismissal, despite her achievements in the energy sector. Ukrainian media called it "the first betrayal of Viktor Yushchenko". Soon after her dismissal, Tymoshenko took leadership of the National Salvation Committee and became active in the Ukraine without Kuchma protests. The movement embraced a number of opposition parties, such as Yulia Tymoshenko Bloc (BYuT, led by "Fatherland"), Ukrainian Republican Party, Ukrainian Conservative Republican Party, "Sobor", Ukrainian Social-Democratic Party, Ukrainian Christian-Democratic Party and Patriotic Party.

=== First criminal persecution ===
==== Electoral campaigning and first arrest ====
Our government was doing almost an underground work under the rigorous pressure of president Kuchma and criminal-oligarchic groups. All anti-shadow and anti-corruption initiatives of the Cabinet of Ministers were being blocked, while the Government was being an object of blackmailing and different provocations. People were arrested only because their relatives were working for the Cabinet of Ministers and were carrying out real reforms that were murderous for the corrupted system of power.

— Yulia Tymoshenko Nezavisimaya Gazeta interview (25 October 2001)

On 9 February 2001, Tymoshenko founded the Yulia Tymoshenko Bloc (the National Salvation Committee merged into it), a political bloc that received 7.2% of the vote in the 2002 parliamentary election. She has been head of the Batkivshchyna (Fatherland) political party since its establishment in 1999.

On 13 February 2001, Tymoshenko was arrested and charged with forging customs documents and smuggling gas in 1997 (while president of UESU). Her political supporters organized numerous protest rallies near the Lukyanivska Prison where she was held in custody.

In a letter to the editor of the British newspaper Financial Times, Tymoshenko claimed that Kuchma was consciously building a totalitarian system in the country:

I believe that Mr Kuchma's regime may go so far as to eliminate me physically, not just politically, but I have made my choice and will continue to fight him by democratic methods. President Kuchma says I have committed a crime. My only "crime" has been to fight the corruption, shadow economy and totalitarianism that have been created by this president of Ukraine. Yulia Tymoshenko Prisoner of Conscience and Former Deputy Prime Minister, Ukraine.

On 11 August 2001, civilian and military prosecutors in Russia opened a new criminal case against Tymoshenko accusing her of bribery. On 27 December 2005, Russian prosecutors dropped these charges. Russian prosecutors had suspended an arrest warrant when she was appointed prime minister, but reinstated it after she was fired in September 2005. The prosecutors suspended it again when she came to Moscow for questioning on 25 September 2005. Tymoshenko didn't travel to Russia during her first seven months as prime minister (the first Tymoshenko Government).

Tymoshenko's husband, Oleksandr, spent two years (2002–2004) in hiding in order to avoid incarceration on charges the couple said were unfounded and politically motivated by the former Kuchma administration.

==== Liberation and resumption of political activity ====
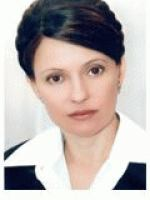
Tymoshenko's official portrait as People's Deputy of Ukraine, 2002

In March 2001, Pechersk District Court (Kyiv) found the charges groundless and cancelled the arrest sanction. According to Tymoshenko, the charges were fabricated by Kuchma's regime at the behest of oligarchs threatened by her efforts to eradicate corruption and institute market-based reforms. On 9 April 2003, the Kyiv Court of Appeal issued a ruling that invalidated and cancelled proceedings on the criminal cases against Yulia and Oleksandr Tymoshenko. Despite Tymoshenko being cleared of the charges, Moscow maintained an arrest warrant for her should she enter Russia. In 2005, all charges were declared groundless and lifted.

The criminal case was closed in Ukraine in January 2005 due to lack of evidence, and in Russia in December 2005 by reason of lapse of time. On 18 November 2005, the Supreme Court of Ukraine issued a ruling which invalidated all criminal cases against Tymoshenko and her family.

Once the charges were dropped, Tymoshenko reassumed her place among the leaders of the grassroots campaign against Kuchma for his alleged role in the murder of the journalist Georgiy Gongadze. In this campaign, Tymoshenko first became known as a passionate, revolutionist leader, an example of this being a TV broadcast of her smashing prison windows during one of the rallies. At the time, Tymoshenko wanted to organise a national referendum to impeach Kuchma.

In January 2002, Tymoshenko was involved in a car accident that she survived with minor injuries.

=== Role in the Orange Revolution ===
==== Alliance with Yushchenko and Moroz ====
In late 2001, both Tymoshenko and Yushchenko attempted to create a broad opposition bloc against Kuchma, in order to win the Ukrainian presidential election of 2004.

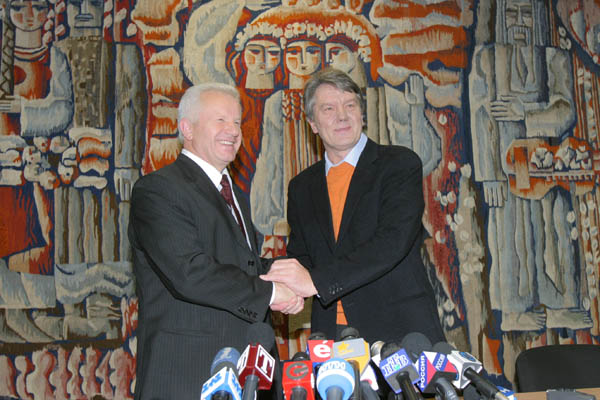
Oleksandr Moroz and Viktor Yushchenko, Tymoshenko's allies during the 2004 presidential campaign

In late 2002, Tymoshenko, Oleksandr Moroz (Socialist Party of Ukraine), Petro Symonenko (Communist Party of Ukraine) and Yushchenko (Our Ukraine) issued a joint statement concerning "the beginning of a state revolution in Ukraine". In the 2004 Ukrainian presidential election, the communist party stepped out of the alliance, but the other parties remained allied and Symonenko was against a single candidate from the alliance (until July 2006).

In March 2004, Tymoshenko announced that leaders of "Our Ukraine", Yulia Tymoshenko Bloc and Socialist Party of Ukraine were working on a coalition agreement concerning joint participation in the presidential campaign. Tymoshenko decided not to run for president and give way to Yushchenko. On 2 July 2004, Our Ukraine and the BYuT established the Force of the people, a coalition which aimed to stop "the destructive process that has, as a result of the incumbent authorities, become a characteristic for Ukraine." The pact included a promise by Yushchenko to nominate Tymoshenko as prime minister if Yushchenko should win the October 2004 presidential election. Tymoshenko was actively campaigning for Yushchenko, touring and taking part in rallies all over Ukraine. After Yushchenko had dropped out of the campaign due to his mysterious poisoning, Tymoshenko continued campaigning on his behalf.

==== Protest leader ====
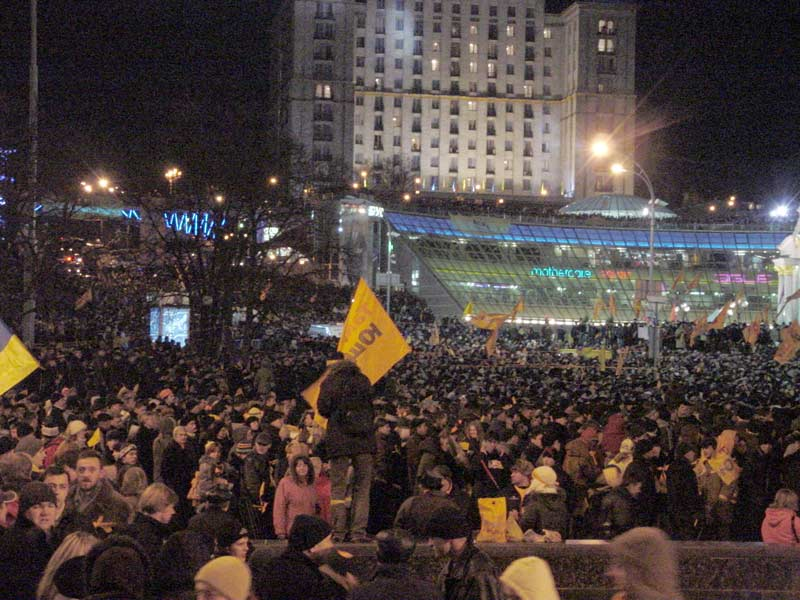
Protests on Kyiv's Maidan Nezalezhnosti during the Orange Revolution

After the initial vote on 31 October, two candidates – Yanukovych and Yushchenko – proceeded to a runoff. As Tymoshenko earlier envisaged, Yushchenko received endorsement from former competitors who did not make it to the runoff, such as Oleksandr Moroz (Socialist Party), Anatoliy Kinakh (Party of Industrialists and Entrepreneurs), Kyiv city mayor Oleksandr Omelchenko and others.

On 6 November 2004, Tymoshenko asked people to spread the orange symbols (orange was the color of Yushchenko's campaign). "Grab a piece of the cheapest orange cloth, make ribbons and put them everywhere" she said. "Don't wait until the campaign managers give those to you".

When allegations of fraud began to spread, the "orange team" decided to conduct a parallel vote tabulation during 21 November 2004 runoff and announce the results immediately to people on Independence Square (Maidan Nezalezhnosti) in Kyiv. Tymoshenko called Kyiv residents to gather on the square and asked people from other cities and towns to come and stand for their choice. "Bring warm clothes, lard and bread, garlic and onions and come to Kyiv" she said. On 22 November 2004, massive protests broke out in cities across Ukraine: The largest, in Kyiv's Maidan Nezalezhnosti, attracted an estimated 500,000 participants. These protests became known as the Orange Revolution. On 23 November 2004, Tymoshenko led the participants of the protest to the President's Administration. On Bankova Street, special riot police prevented the procession from going any further, so people lifted Tymoshenko up and she walked on the police's shields to the Administration building.

On 3 December 2004, the Supreme Court of Ukraine invalidated the results of the runoff and scheduled the re-run for 26 December 2004. After the cancellation of Yanukovych's official victory and the second round of the election, Yushchenko was elected president with 51.99% of votes (Yanukovych received 44.2% support).

During the protests, Tymoshenko's speeches on the Maidan kept the momentum of the street protests going. Her popularity grew significantly to the point where the media began to refer to her as the Ukrainian or Slavic "Joan of Arc" as well as "Queen of the Orange revolution" in addition to her pre existing sobriquet from the 1990s decade as the "Gas Princess". Additional nicknames included "Goddess of the Revolution" and the "Princess Leia of Ukrainian politics".

=== First term as prime minister (February – September 2005) ===
==== Appointment and reactions ====
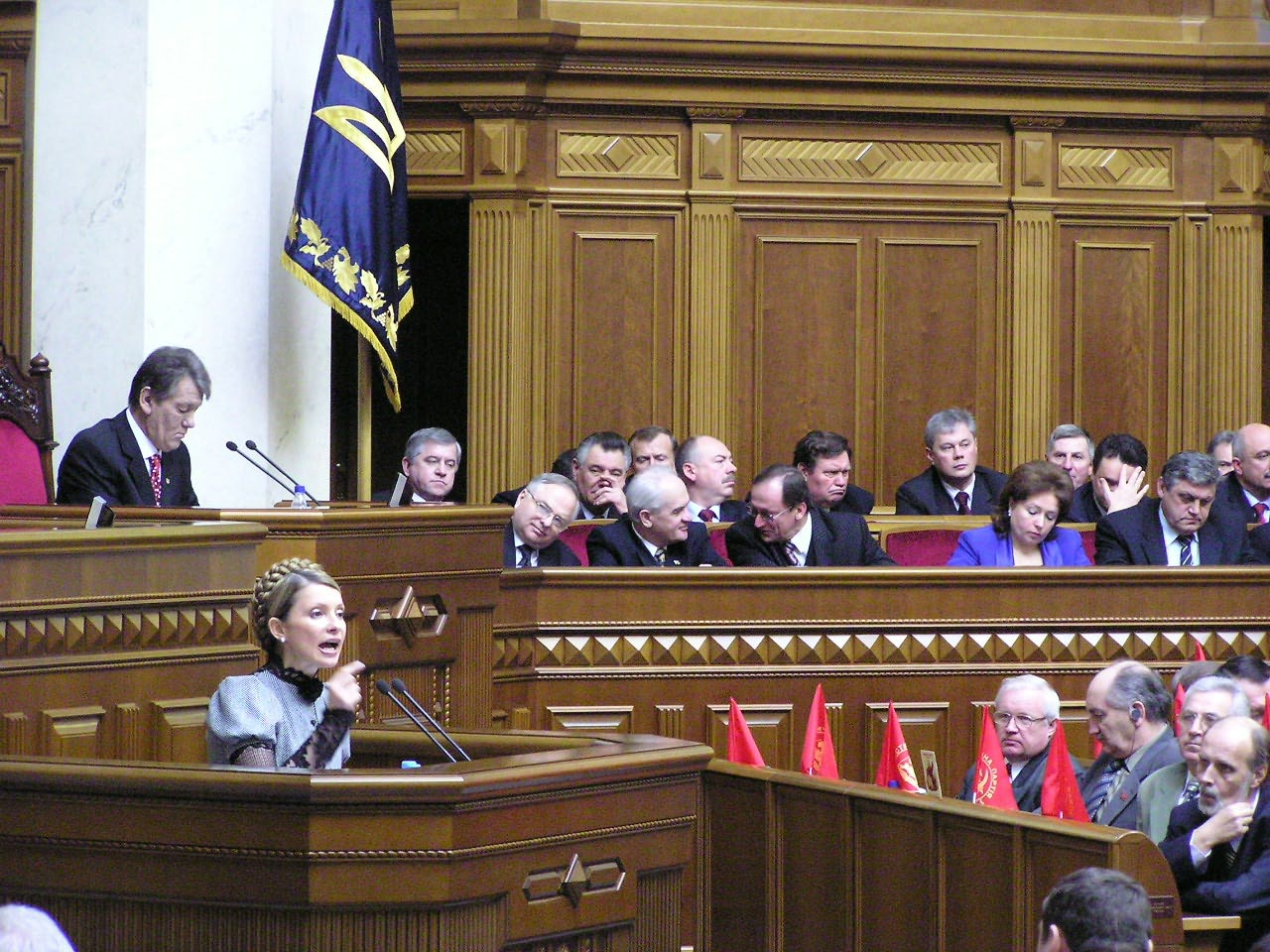
Yulia Tymoshenko in Parliament, 4 February 2005

On 24 January 2005, Tymoshenko was appointed acting prime minister of Ukraine under Yushchenko's presidency. On 4 February, Tymoshenko's premiership appointment was ratified by the parliament with an overwhelming majority of 373 votes (226 were required for approval). She is the first woman appointed Prime Minister of Ukraine. (Note: In July 2025 Yulia Svyrydenko would become the second woman to be appointed Prime Minister of Ukraine.)

The Tymoshenko cabinet did not include any other members of Yulia Tymoshenko Bloc besides Tymoshenko herself and Oleksandr Turchynov, who was appointed the chief of Security Service of Ukraine. The ministers who were working with her took her side in the later confrontation with Viktor Yushchenko.

On 28 July 2005, Forbes named Tymoshenko the third most powerful woman in the world, behind only Condoleezza Rice and Wu Yi. However, in the magazine's list published on 1 September 2006, Tymoshenko's name was not among the top 100.

In September 2005, Tymoshenko received the "Person of the Year of Central and Eastern Europe" award according to the 15th International Economic Forum in Krynica Górska.

==== Conflict with Yushchenko and dismissal ====
Several months into her government, internal conflicts within the post‐Revolution coalition began to damage Tymoshenko's administration. On 24 August 2005, Viktor Yushchenko gave an Independence Day speech during which he called Tymoshenko's government "the best".

Yet on 8 September, after the resignation of several senior officials, including the Head of the Security and Defense Council Petro Poroshenko and Deputy Prime Minister Mykola Tomenko, Tymoshenko's government was dismissed by Yushchenko during a live television address to the nation. Yushchenko went on to criticize her work as head of the Cabinet, suggesting it had led to an economic slowdown and political conflicts within the ruling coalition. He said that Tymoshenko was serving interests of some businesses, and the government decision to re-privatize the Nikopol Ferroalloy Plant (previously owned by Kuchma's son in law Viktor Pinchuk) "was the last drop" that made him dismiss the government. On 13 September 2005, Yushchenko accused Tymoshenko of betrayal of "Orange Revolution" ideas. In his interview for the Associated Press, he said that during the time of her presidency at UESU, Tymoshenko accumulated an 8 million Hryvna debt, and that she had used her authority as prime minister to write off that debt. Tymoshenko has repeatedly stated that the mentioned amount was not a debt, but fines imposed by the Tax Inspection from 1997 to 1998, and that all the cases regarding UESU had been closed before she became prime minister.

Tymoshenko blamed Yushchenko's closest circle for scheming against her and undermining the activities of her Cabinet. She also criticised Yushchenko, telling the BBC that he had "practically ruined our unity, our future, the future of the country", without rooting out corruption as he pledged to do and that the president's action was absolutely illogical.

At the time, Tymoshenko saw a rapid growth of approval ratings, while Yushchenko's approval ratings went down. This tendency was later proved by the results of parliamentary elections in 2006, when for the first time ever BYuT outran "Our Ukraine" party, winning 129 seats vs. 81, respectively. During the previous parliamentary elections of 2002, BYuT had only 22 members of parliament, while "Our Ukraine" had 112.

The work of Tymoshenko as prime minister in 2005 was complicated due to internal conflicts in the "orange" team. According to Tymoshenko, Yushchenko and Poroshenko were trying to turn the National Security and Defense Council into the "second Cabinet of Ministers".

Tymoshenko was succeeded as prime minister by Yuriy Yekhanurov.

=== Opposition and 2006 parliamentary election ===
==== Electoral campaign ====
Soon after Tymoshenko's discharge in September 2005, the General Prosecutor Office of the Russian Federation dismissed all charges against her. On 18 November 2005, the Supreme Court of Ukraine issued a ruling which invalidated all criminal cases against Tymoshenko and her family.

After her dismissal, Tymoshenko started to tour the country in a bid to win the 2006 Ukrainian parliamentary election as the leader of her Bloc. (Note: On 7 December 2005, Bloc of Yulia Tymoshenko held a convention in Kyiv. At this convention Yulia Tymoshenko presented a new ideology of the Bloc ("solidarism") and announced the first top 10 of the party list for the upcoming parliamentary election of 2006. Unlike the other parties that ran for election, BYuT did not disclose the rest of the names on the list. On 26 March 2006, BYuT won 22.27% of votes (5,648,345 votes) and came first in 14 regions of Ukraine.) Tymoshenko soon announced that she wanted to return to the post of prime minister. She managed to form a strong team that started a political fight on two fronts – with Yanukovych's and Yushchenko's camps.

==== Coalition negotiations ====
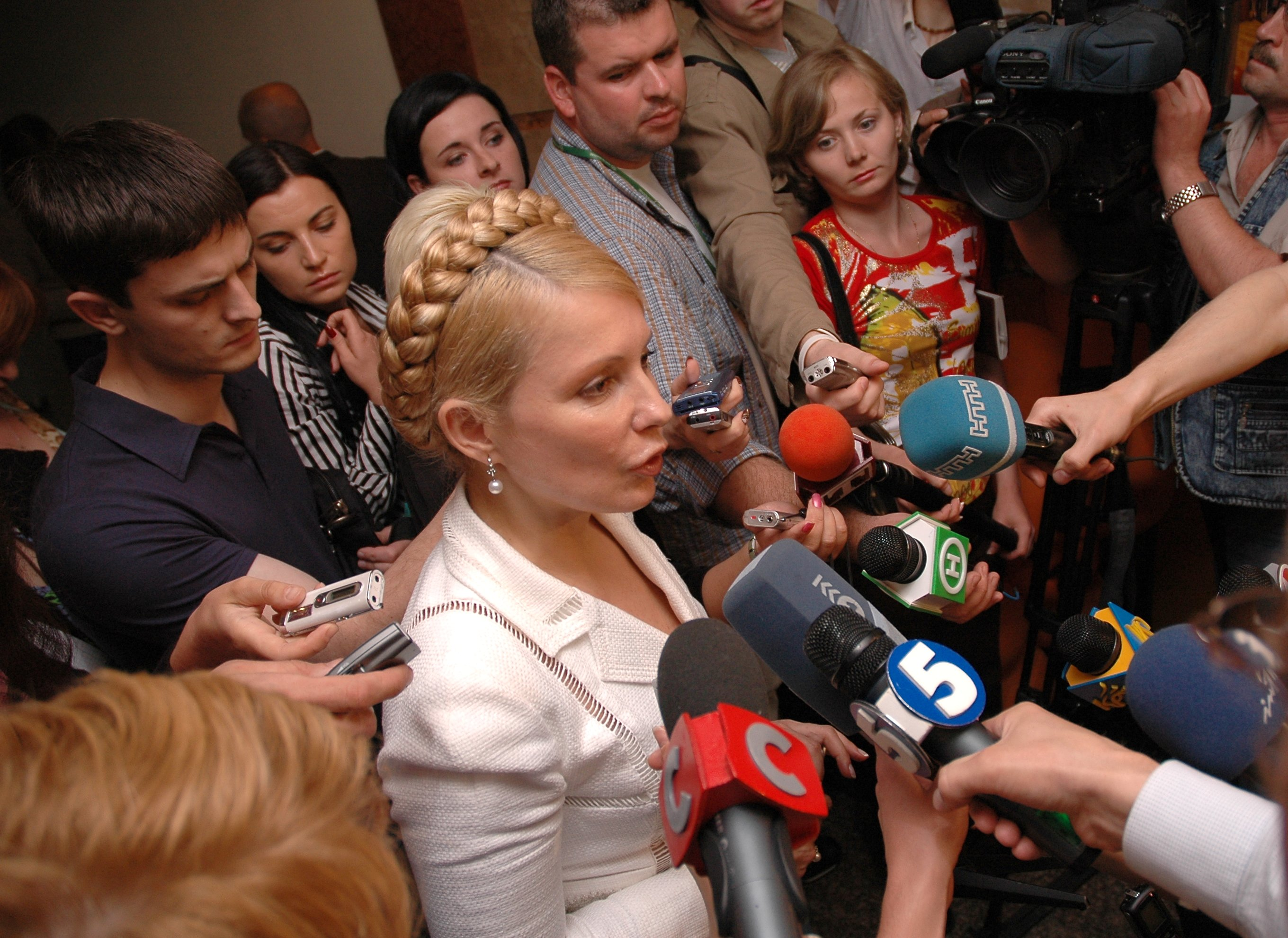
Tymoshenko giving an interview during her party's negotiations with Our Ukraine in June 2006

With the Bloc coming second in the election, and winning 129 seats, many speculated that she might form a coalition with Yushchenko's "Our Ukraine" party and the Socialist Party of Ukraine (SPU) to prevent the Party of Regions from gaining power. Tymoshenko again reiterated her stance in regard to becoming prime minister. However, negotiations with "Our Ukraine" and SPU faced many difficulties as the various blocs fought over posts and engaged in counter-negotiations with other groups.

After lengthy negotiations, SPU suddenly pulled out of the Coalition and joined the alliance with the Party of Regions and the Communist Party of Ukraine. Moroz assured that the team of Yushchenko was conducting secret negotiations with the Party of Regions. According to that deal, Yanukovych was supposed to become the speaker, while Yuriy Yekhanurov kept the prime minister portfolio. These negotiations were conducted by Yekhanurov himself upon Yushchenko's request. Later, Yekhanurov admitted this fact in his interview with the "Ukrainska Pravda" website.

Following the surprise nomination of Moroz as the Rada speaker and his subsequent election late on 6 July with the support of the Party of Regions, the "Orange coalition" collapsed. After the creation of a large coalition of majority composed of the Party of Regions, the Socialist Party of Ukraine and the Communist Party of Ukraine, Yanukovych became prime minister, and the other two parties were left in the wilderness. On 3 August 2006, Tymoshenko refused to sign the "Universal of National Unity" declaration initiated by Yushchenko. Signed by Yushchenko, Yanukovych and leaders of Socialist and Communist parties, the document sealed Yanukovych's appointment as prime minister. Tymoshenko called it "an act of betrayal". In September 2006, she announced that her political force would be in opposition to the new government. Our Ukraine stalled until 4 October 2006, when it too joined the opposition.

On 12 January 2007, a BYuT vote in the parliament overrode the president's veto of the "On the Cabinet of Ministers" law that was advantageous for the president. (In exchange, BYuT voted for the "On Imperative Mandate" and "On Opposition" laws). This vote was one of many steps undertaken by BYuT to ruin a fragile alliance between president Yushchenko and prime minister Yanukovych. (Note: See more at 2007 Ukrainian political crisis.)

==== New campaign and dissolution of Rada ====
In March 2007, Tymoshenko traveled to the United States, where she held high-level meetings with Vice President Dick Cheney, Secretary of State Condoleezza Rice and Stephen Hadley, the National Security Advisor under President George W. Bush. (Note: The key purpose of her visit was to explain to the US administration "the biggest problem of Ukrainian politics": Yanukovych's actions toward unconstitutional enlargement of the "ruling coalition" that could potentially remove Viktor Yushchenko from power. The only possible solution envisaged by Tymoshenko was dismissal of the Verkhovna Rada (according to the Constitution) and an early parliamentary election. In addition to meeting with top officials of the Bush administration, Tymoshenko gave speeches at the Kennedy Center for Strategic and International Studies and the National Press Club. She also received an award for her contribution to the development of democracy in Ukraine from the influential NGO Conservative Political Action Conference.) On 31 March 2007, Tymoshenko initiated a "100 thousand people Maidan" aimed to urge the president to call an early parliamentary election. (Note: On 31 March 2007, Tymoshenko and her political party initiated and conducted the "100 thousand people Maidan". Other Orange Revolution leaders such as Viacheslav Kyrylenko and Yuriy Lutsenko attended the meeting. The participants urged Yushchenko (who was not there) to dismiss the Verkhovna Rada and call early election. During this trip she received an award for contribution into democracy development from Conservative Political Action Conference.)

On 4 April 2007, Yushchenko issued an edict "On early termination of duties of the Verkhovna Rada" as a reaction to violation of the Constitution by the Party of Regions, which had started dragging individual deputies into the "ruling coalition" (this being illegal, as coalitions should be formed by factions and not by individual deputies). In doing so, the Party of Regions was trying to achieve a constitutional majority of 300 votes which would enable Yanukovych to override the president's veto and control the legislative process. Party of Regions did not obey this edict. In order to dismiss the Verkhovna Rada, Tymoshenko and her supporters in the parliament (168 deputies from BYuT and "Our Ukraine" factions) quit their parliamentary factions on 2 June 2007. That step invalidated the convocation of the Verkhovna Rada and cleared the path to an early election.

An early parliamentary election was held on 30 September 2007.

=== 2007 parliamentary election ===
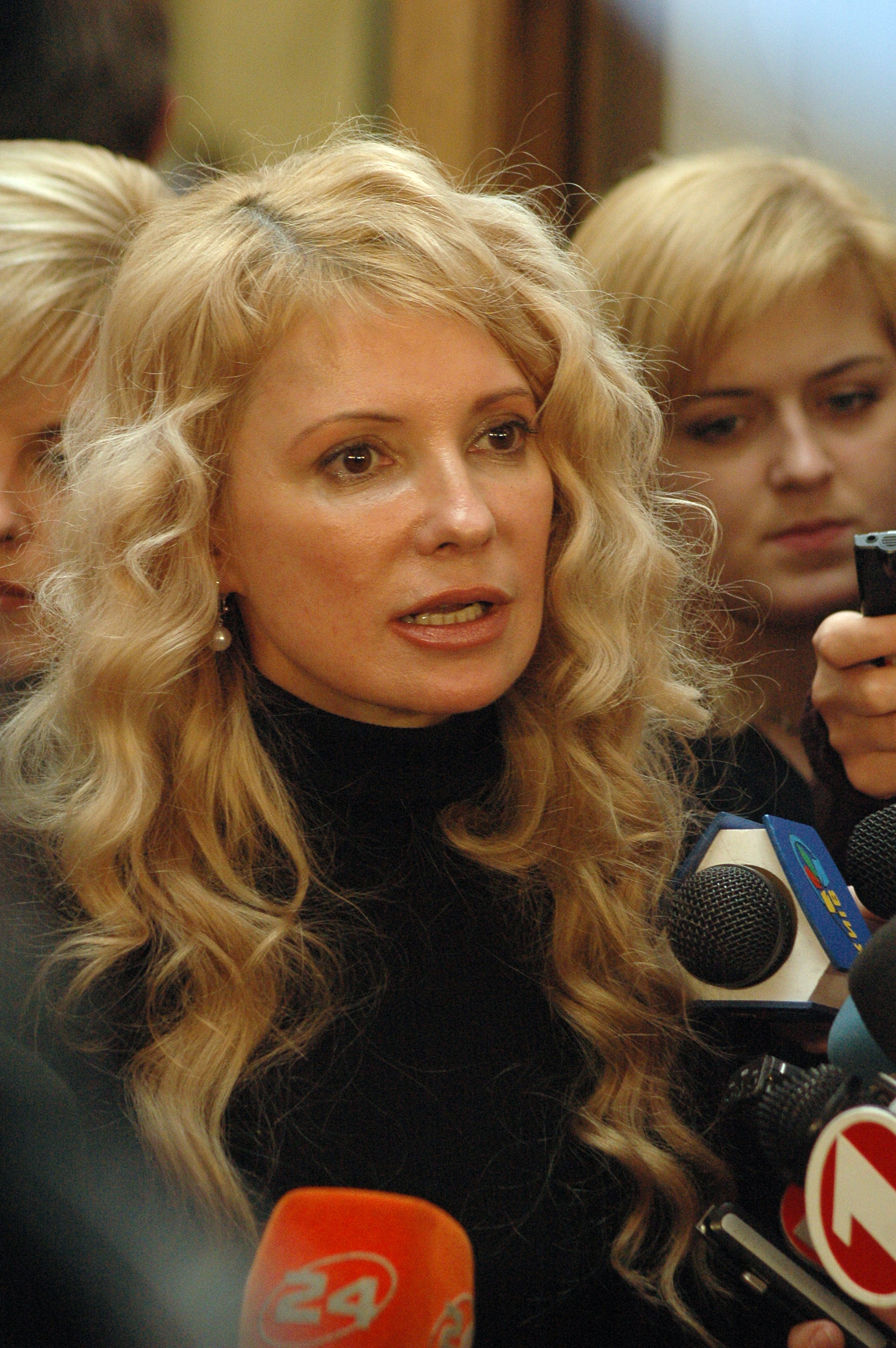
Yulia Tymoshenko, 2007

Following balloting in the 2007 parliamentary elections held on 30 September 2007, Orange Revolution parties had won majority of 229 votes of BYUT fraction (30,71% of the votes (156 seats) and the Our Ukraine/People's Self-defence faction. On 3 October 2007, an almost final tally gave the alliance of Tymoshenko and Yushchenko a slim lead over the rival party of Prime Minister Yanukovych, thanks in part to a vigorous BYuT campaign in the industrial east, a Party of Regions stronghold. Although Yanukovych, whose party won the single biggest share of the vote, also claimed victory, one of his coalition allies, the Socialist Party of Ukraine, failed to gain enough votes to retain seats in Parliament.

On 15 October 2007, the Our Ukraine–People's Self-Defense Bloc and the Yulia Tymoshenko Bloc agreed to form a majority coalition in the new parliament of the 6th convocation. On 29 November, a coalition was signed between the Yulia Tymoshenko Bloc and Our Ukraine–People's Self-Defense Bloc, which was associated with President Yushchenko. Both parties are affiliated with the Orange Revolution. On 11 December 2007, the Coalition failed in its attempt to appoint Tymoshenko prime minister, falling one vote short (225 members of parliament supported her nomination). On 12 December 2007, the media reported on the possible attempted assassination of Tymoshenko. BYuT and Tymoshenko herself said it was an intimidation. On 18 December, Tymoshenko was once again elected as prime minister (supported by 226 deputies, the minimal number needed for passage), heading the second Tymoshenko Government.

=== Second term as prime minister (2007-2010) ===
==== Renewed political struggles ====
On 11 July 2008, the Party of Regions tried to vote no-confidence to Tymoshenko's government in the parliament, but could not collect enough votes.

The coalition of Tymoshenko's Bloc (BYuT) and Yushchenko's Our Ukraine–People's Self-Defense Bloc (OU-PSD) was put at risk due to deliberate misinterpretation of Tymoshenko's opinion on the ongoing 2008 South Ossetia War between Georgia and Russia. Yushchenko's office accused her of taking a softer position in order to gain support from Russia in the upcoming 2010 election. Andriy Kyslynskyi, the president's deputy chief of staff, went as far as to accuse her of 'high treason'. According to Ukrainska Pravda and Newswire.ca Tymoshenko expressed her solidarity with Georgia on 13 and 14 August, and later preferred to stay neutral on the issue as according to Constitution President Yushchenko headed foreign policy issues.

Tymoshenko on Russo–Georgian war:

"We stand in solidarity with the democratically-elected leadership of Georgia. Georgia's sovereignty and territorial integrity must be respected

— Yulia Tymoshenko's press briefing on 13 August 2008

According to BYuT, Viktor Baloha (Chief of Staff of the Presidential Secretariat) criticized the premier at every turn, doing the dirty job for the President and accusing her of everything from not being religious enough to damaging the economy and plotting to kill him, and the accusation of 'betrayal' over Georgia was simply one of the latest and most pernicious attacks directed at the premier.

==== Conflict with Yushchenko and attempts at dismissal ====
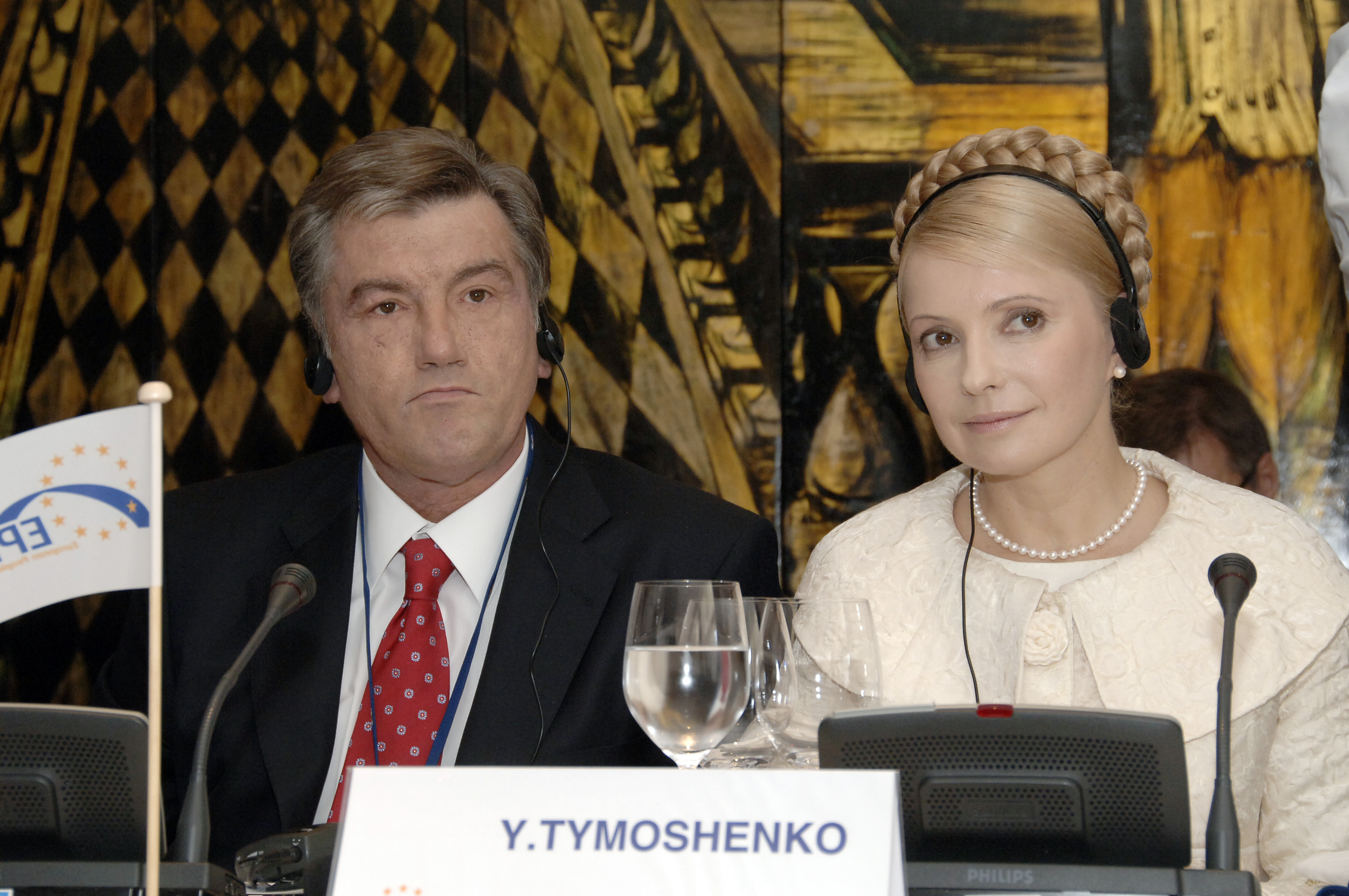
Tymoshenko and Yushchenko at the European People's Party summit in Lisbon, October 2007

After Tymoshenko's BYuT voted alongside the Communist Party of Ukraine and the Party of Regions to pass legislation that would facilitate the procedure of impeachment for future presidents and limit the president's power while increasing the prime minister's powers, President Yushchenko's OU-PSD bloc pulled out of the coalition and Yushchenko promised to veto the legislation and threatened to hold an election if a new coalition was not formed soon. This resulted in the 2008 Ukrainian political crisis, which culminated in Yushchenko calling an early parliamentary election on 8 October 2008. Tymoshenko was fiercely opposed to the snap election, stating that if Yushchenko and Yanukovych did enact a snap election, they will bear responsibility for the effects of the 2008 financial crisis. Initially, the election was to be held on 7 December 2008, but was later postponed to an unknown date. Tymoshenko had no intention of resigning until a new coalition was formed.

In early December 2008, there were negotiations between BYuT and the Party of Regions to form a coalition, but after Volodymyr Lytvyn was elected Chairman of the Verkhovna Rada (parliament of Ukraine) on 9 December 2008, he announced the creation of a coalition between his Lytvyn Bloc, BYuT and OU-PSD. After negotiations, the three parties officially signed the coalition agreement on 16 December. It was not known whether this coalition would stop the snap election, although Speaker Volodymyr Lytvyn predicted the Verkhovna Rada would work until 2012.

==== Financial crisis and anti-corruption policies ====
On 18 December 2008, for the first time Tymoshenko accused the National Bank of Ukraine in the conscious manipulation of the hryvnia, and President Yushchenko of colluding with the leadership of the NBU, which led to depreciation of the national currency to the level of ₴8 per US dollar.

A large part of Tymoshenko's second term as prime minister coincided in time with the 2008 financial crisis, which required her government to respond to numerous challenges that could have led to the country's economic collapse. (Note: Tymoshenko herself outlines the biggest achievements of her government introducing anti crisis program for the key industries (mining and metallurgical sector, agrarian sector, chemical production, construction and development), strengthening Ukraine's energy independence through direct gas deals with Russian Federation, restoring Ukraine's fame as the world's bread basket due to unprecedentedly rich crops of grain (53.3 million tons in 2008, and 46 million tons in 2009), preventing drop in the agricultural production, revitalization of high-tech industries such as space engineering and aircraft construction, resuming of series construction of Antonov aircraft, getting final UEFA's confirmation for conduct Euro-2012 tournament in Ukraine, introducing independent high school graduate testing, obtaining WTO membership, and commencing negotiations on EU association.)

Tymoshenko's government launched an anti-corruption campaign and identified it as one of its priorities. (Note: Tymoshenko introduced an apparatus of the Cabinet of Ministers' Commissioner for anti corruption issues and made sure that a number of anti corruption laws and government regulations (acts) were adopted. Tymoshenko herself was personally in charge of fight with "gas" and "land" mafia, which, in the first case, ended up with removal of corruption intermediary from gas trade between Russia and Ukraine; in the second case it ended up with introduction of free of charge registration and issuing land ownership documents for citizens. According to Tymoshenko, the efficient anti corruption campaign [167] and significant financial discipline armed the government with additional resources for dealing with burning social problems during the crisis period. Due to that the following goals were achieved: pensions, stipends and salaries to the state-run organizations' employees were paid on time; gas and electricity prices for households were not raised; people received their deposits from the bankrupt banks; additional payments for teachers, healthcare workers and librarians were provided; financial aid to families with a newborn child was increased in several times; those who qualify, received more than 5500 state subsidized apartments; about 6 million of clients of former Soviet Oshchadbank received compensations for their lost savings; people could register their land plots free of charge.)

==== 2009 gas dispute with Russia ====
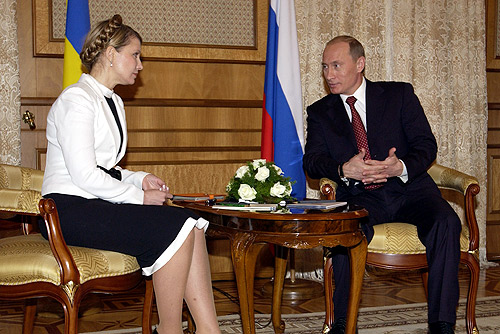
Yulia Tymoshenko and Vladimir Putin meeting on 19 March 2005. In November 2009, Putin praised Tymoshenko's political choices and stated that he found it comfortable to work with her.

The conditions leading to the 2009 gas dispute were created in 2006, under the Yushchenko government, when Ukraine started buying Russian gas through an intermediary, Swiss-registered RosUkrEnergo. Fifty percent of RosUkrEnergo shares were owned by the Russian Gazprom, with 45 percent and 5 percent owned by Ukrainian businessmen Dmytro Firtash and Ivan Fursin, respectively. Some sources indicate that notorious criminal boss Semion Mogilevich (associated with Dmytro Firtash) also owned shares in the company.

When Tymoshenko resumed her prime minister duties in 2007, she argued for a direct contract for gas supplies from Russia to Ukraine. In 2008, the two prime ministers signed a Memorandum on the elimination of gas intermediaries. The 2 October 2008 Memorandum signed by Tymoshenko and Putin stipulated liquidation of intermediaries in gas deals between the two countries and outlined detailed conditions for future gas contracts. The gas conflict of 2009 broke out because of two factors, the lack of a gas contract for 2009 and a $2.4 billion debt that Ukraine had yet to pay for gas received in 2008. Tymoshenko stated that it was the RosUkrEnergo company that was responsible for the debt, rather than the state of Ukraine. She called for an end to corruption in the gas trade area and the establishment of direct contracts with the Russian Federation.

A 2009 map of gas pipes connecting Russia and EU through Ukraine

RosUkrEnergo, with the aid of its ties to Yushchenko's administration, managed to disrupt the signing of a gas contract scheduled for 31 December 2008. Alexey Miller, head of Gazprom, stated that trader RosUkrEnergo broke down talks between Gazprom and Naftogaz Ukrainy: "Yes indeed, in late December 2008, the prime ministers of Russia and Ukraine came to agreement, and our companies were ready to seal the deal for $235 per 1000 cubic meters of natural gas with the condition that all the export operations from Ukraine will be done bilaterally. RosUkrEnergo then suggested to buy gas at $285 price." On 31 December 2008, Yushchenko gave Oleg Dubyna, head of Naftogaz Ukrainy, a direct order to stop talks, not sign the agreement and recall the delegation from Moscow. The decision made by the president of Ukraine brought on the crisis.

On 14 January 2009, Tymoshenko said, "The negotiations on $235 gas price and $1.7–1.8 transit price, that started on October 2 and successfully have been moving forward since, have been broken up because, unfortunately, Ukrainian politicians were trying to keep RosUkrEnergo in business as a shadow intermediary... The negotiations between the two prime ministers and later between Gazprom and Naftogaz Ukrainy were ruined by those Ukrainian political groups, who have gotten and are planning to get corrupt benefits from RosUkrEnergo." On 17 January 2009, President of Russia Dmitriy Medvedev said, "I think that our Ukrainian partners and us can trade gas without any intermediaries, especially without intermediaries with questionable reputation. The problem is that some participants of negotiations insisted on keeping the intermediary referring to the instructions from the top."

On 1 January 2009, at 10 am, Gazprom completely stopped pumping gas to Ukraine. On 4 January, the Russian monopolist offered to sell Ukraine gas for $450 per 1000 cubic meter (minus a fee for gas transit through Ukraine), which was defined as a standard price for Eastern European countries. On 8 January 2009, the prime minister of Russia, Vladimir Putin, said that Ukraine would have to pay $470 for 1000 cubic meters of natural gas.

Between 1 and 18 January, Central and Eastern European countries received significantly less gas. Ukrainian heat-and-power stations were working to utmost capacity. Due to sub-zero temperatures, the entire housing and public utilities sectors were on the verge of collapse. On 14 January, the European Commission and the Czech presidency in the European Union demanded the immediate renewal of gas deliveries in full capacity lest the reputations of Russia and Ukraine as reliable EU partners be seriously damaged. On 18 January 2009, after five-day-long talks, prime ministers Putin and Tymoshenko came to agreement on the renewal of gas delivery to Ukraine and other EU countries. The parties agreed upon the following: A return to direct contract deals between Gazprom and Naftogaz Ukrainy; the removal of non-transparent intermediaries; the introduction of formula-based pricing for Ukraine (which also works for other Eastern European countries); and a switch to a $2.7 transit fee, which is close to the average price in Europe. According to the new gas contract, in 2009 Ukraine paid an average price of $232.98 per 1000 cubic meters, while other European consumers were paying above $500 per 1000 cubic meters.

==== Continuing conflict with Yushchenko ====
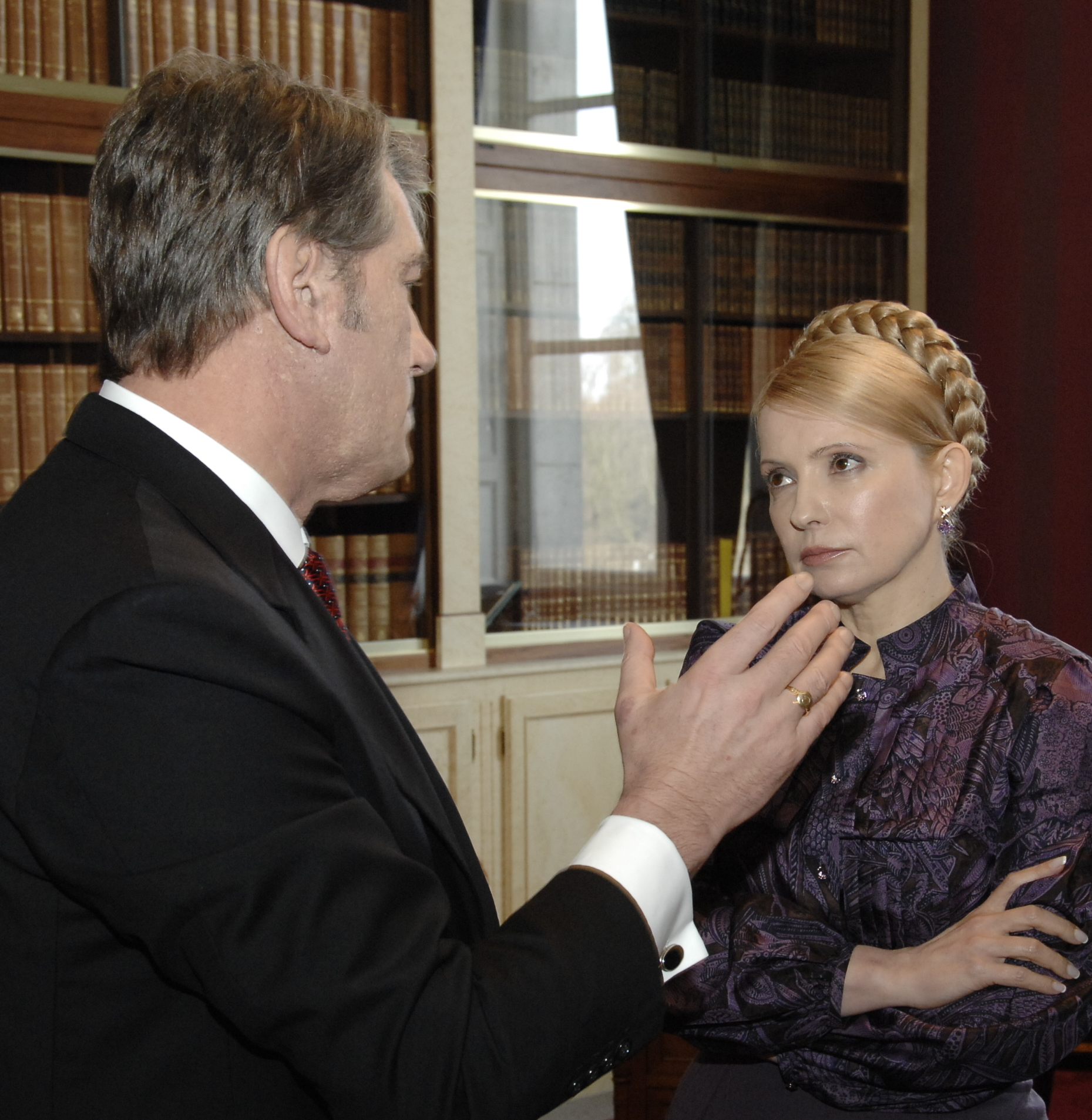
Yulia Tymoshenko with Viktor Yushchenko in 2009

In 2009, the relations between Tymoshenko and Yushchenko, the Secretariat of the President of Ukraine and the oppositional Party of Regions remained hostile. Tymoshenko emphasized early in February 2009 that the "electoral struggle for the next presidential elections has virtually begun."

On 5 February 2009, Tymoshenko's opponents in the parliament were trying to dismiss her government again, but again the vote failed. The following day, president Yushchenko strongly criticized Tymoshenko and the economic policies of her government. Tymoshenko accused him of spreading "a mix of untruths, panic and hysteria."

"This is a competition during economic crisis; [some people] prefer to collect political benefits from these problems instead of solving them together", Tymoshenko said in an interview with German newspaper Frankfurter Allgemeine Zeitung in February 2009. Later, in an interview with the French paper Le Monde, the prime minister said that "the president treats her as a rival striving for president's office." She also added that the previously mentioned political instability fuels the economic crisis. Tymoshenko then called for an early presidential election.

==== Coalition talks with the Party of Regions ====
In April 2009 rumours emerged in the Ukrainian press about the possible creation of a "broad coalition" between the Party of Regions and BYuT. It was claimed that Tymoshenko's allies supported an alliance with Yanukovych due to a significant fall in the government's popularity as a result of the financial crisis. The idea of a broad coalition involving all parties except the pro-Yushchenko wing of Our Ukraine-People's Self-Defence was publicly supported by deputy speaker Mykola Tomenko, and its existence was confirmed by members of the Lytvyn Bloc. However, Party of Regions representative Yaroslav Sukhyi denied his party's plans for a coalition with Tymoshenko's force.

Composition of Verkhovna Rada following the 2007 election; a coalition between BYuT and Party of Regions would have provided them a constitutional majority, making it possible to adopt amendments to the Basic Law.

According to Ukrainska Pravda, the project of the possible coalition agreement between Tymoshenko and Yanukovych included constitutional changes, prolonging the term of the parliament's authority for two years and replacing the popular vote for president with election of the head of state by members of parliament. The project of constitutional changes presented by Oleksandr Zadorozhnii, a close associate of Viktor Medvedchuk, set the minimum age for president at 50 years, disqualifying Yanukovych's main competitors for the post. The project envisioned the approval of Ukraine's membership in NATO or any other collective security organization exclusively by referendum. A "Big Treaty" prepared by Medvedchuk and Zadorozhnii was to guarantee cooperation between BYuT and Party of Regions until 2024 or even 2029, with Yanukovych serving two terms as president during the first half of that term, being followed by Tymoshenko.

The signing of the coalition agreement had been planned for 9 June 2009, however two days before that term it became obvious that the talks had failed. In his TV address issued on 7 June, Yanukovych stated, that the election of president should be conducted by popular vote, and claimed that adopting the terms of the proposed coalition agreement without any public discussion would have been undemocratic. In her address on the same day, Tymoshenko blamed Yanukovych of disrupting the coalition talks and preventing the consolidation of Ukrainian society.

=== 2010 presidential election ===
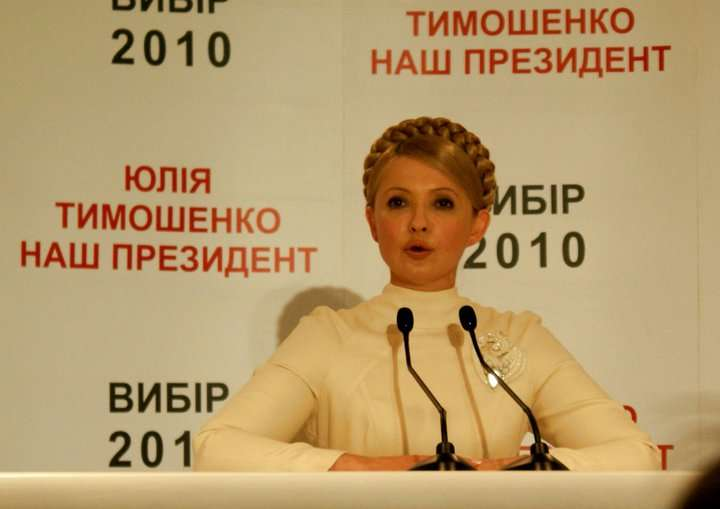
Tymoshenko delivering an address during her presidential campaign in 2010

Tymoshenko was a candidate in the Ukrainian presidential elections of 2010, but lost that election to Viktor Yanukovych (Tymoshenko received 45.47% of the votes in the second and final round of the election, 3% less than her rival).

==== Presidential campaign ====
Having long being considered a possible candidate for President of Ukraine in the 2010 election, Tymoshenko announced that she would indeed compete in the upcoming presidential election in a statement broadcast live on national TV on 7 June 2009. Tymoshenko also stated that if she lost the presidential election she would not challenge the results. On 12 September 2009, a tour in support of Tymoshenko's candidacy, called "With Ukraine in Heart", began on Kyiv's Maidan Nezalezhnosti. Popular Ukrainian singers and bands took part in the tour.

On 24 October 2009, the delegates of all-Ukrainian union "Batkivshchyna" formally and unanimously endorsed Tymoshenko as their candidate for the next Presidential election. The 200 thousand congress took place on Kyiv's Independence Square. On 31 October 2009, the Central Election Commission registered Tymoshenko as a candidate for presidential election in 2010.

The Tymoshenko candidacy was also endorsed by prominent Ukrainian politicians such as Borys Tarasyuk, Yuriy Lutsenko, former President Leonid Kravchuk, the Christian Democratic Union, the European Party of Ukraine and others. Putin stated that he was cooperating with Tymoshenko as Prime Minister of Ukraine, but that he was not supporting her in the election.

As soon as Yushchenko and Yanukovych appear on the tribune, expect failure. And how can we forget the match between Ukraine and Greece, when our team lost the trip to South Africa. Why? Because two "lucky" politicians came to the deciding match and transferred their lucky aura to the entire Ukrainian team.

— Yulia Tymoshenko's personal blog (7 December 2009)

Tymoshenko's campaign was expected to have cost $100 to $150 million.

Tymoshenko expected early parliamentary elections after the 2010 presidential election if Yanukovych won the vote, but she was against this.

On 1 December 2009, Tymoshenko urged "national democratic forces" to unite around the candidate who garnered the largest number of votes after the first round of the presidential elections. "If we are not able to strengthen our efforts and unite the whole national-patriotic and democratic camp of Ukraine... we will be much weaker than those who want revenge." On 5 December 2009, she declared she would go into opposition if she lost the presidential election. She also complained of flaws in the election legislation, and expressed her certainty that attempts were being made by her opponents to carry out vote rigging.

==== Electoral defeat ====
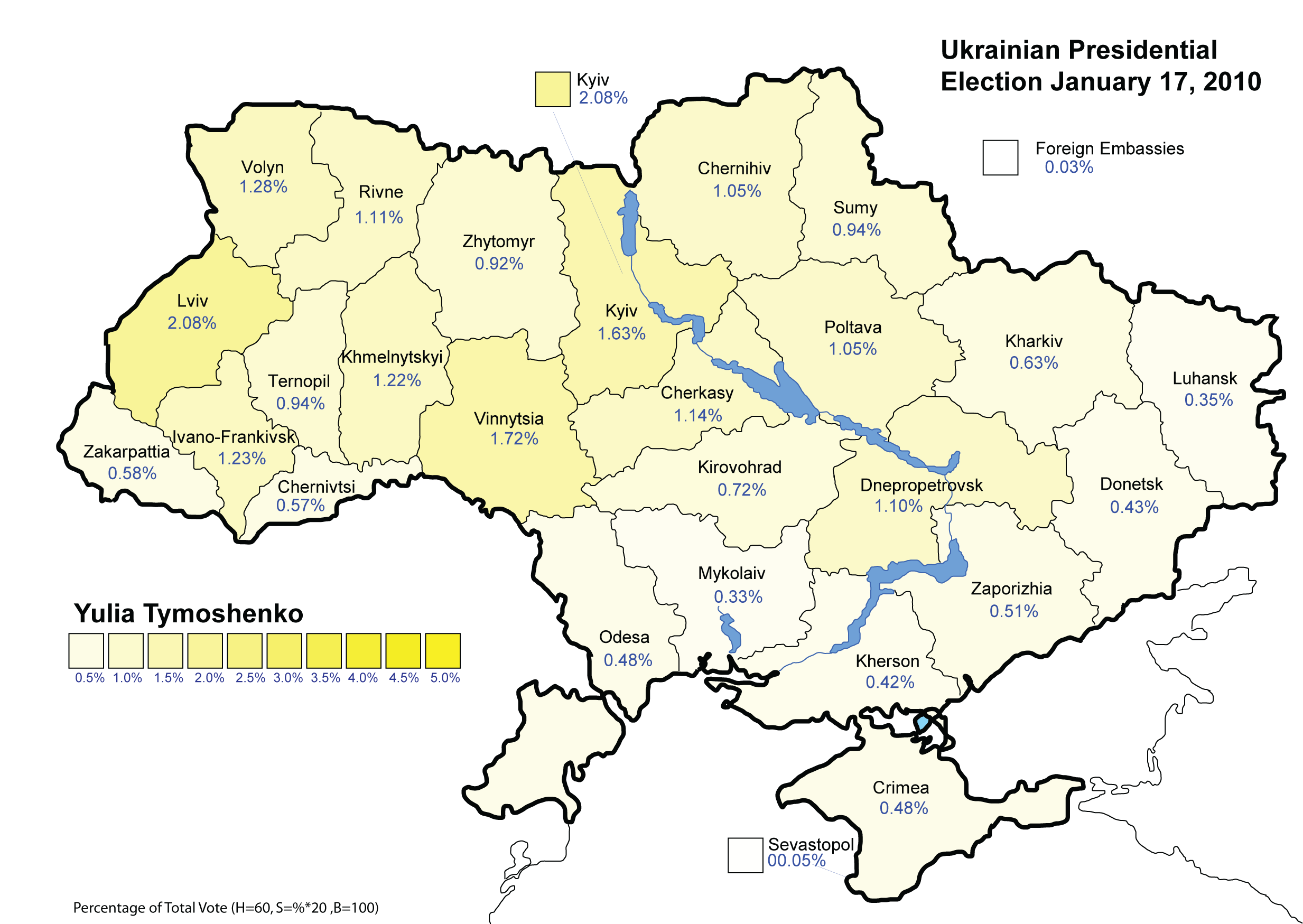
Yulia Tymoshenko (first round) – percentage of total national vote (25%)

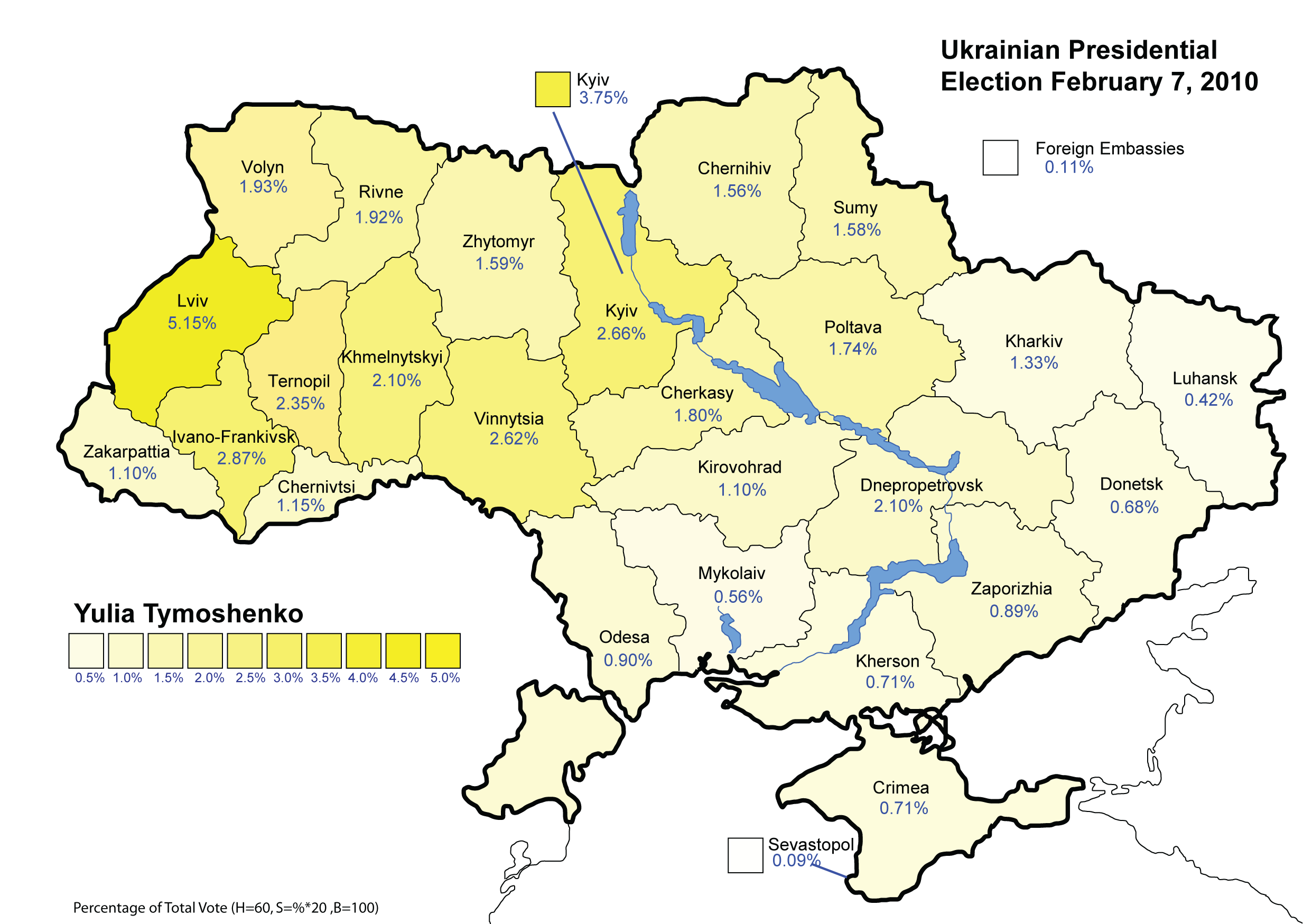
Yulia Tymoshenko (second round) – percentage of total national vote (45%)

In the first round of the presidential election on 17 January 2010, Tymoshenko took second place with 25% of the vote, and Yanukovych took first place with 35%. The two proceeded to a runoff.

On 3 February 2010, two days before the run-off, the deputies from Party of Regions, Communist Party of Ukraine, "Our Ukraine – People's Self-Defense" bloc and independent MPs amended the Law on Election of President, which changed the mode of composition and functioning of election commissions. BYuT warned that these amendments would create opportunities for the massive rigging of elections. Tymoshenko called on president Yushchenko to veto the law. Hanne Severinsen, former rapporteur of PACE Monitoring Committee on Ukraine, also called on the president to veto the law. Severinsen's statement read: "Unfortunately, the Party of Regions, as in 2004, is trying to create conditions for vote fraud."

Despite these requests, Yushchenko signed the amended Law. This action generated vast international criticism from the Council of Europe and from members of the US congress' Commission on Security and Cooperation in Europe. The Committee of Voters of Ukraine stated that the amendments to the Law on Election of President "contained the biggest threats for democratic mode of the run-off."

Tymoshenko did not receive endorsement from other candidates who had not survived the first round of voting. In the run-off held on 7 February 2010, Yanukovych was elected President of Ukraine. According to the Central Election Commission, he received 48.95% of the votes; Tymoshenko received 45.47% of the votes. Tymoshenko won 17 of 27 constituencies in the western, central and north regions of Ukraine and in Kyiv.

==== Claims of vote rigging and court appeal ====
Yulia Tymoshenko Bloc members immediately claimed that there was systematic and large-scale vote rigging in the run-off election. However, Tymoshenko herself did not issue a statement about the election until a live televised broadcast on 13 February 2010, in which she said that she would challenge the election result in court. Tymoshenko alleged widespread fraud (according to Tymoshenko, a million votes were invalid) and said Yanukovych was not legitimately elected. "Whatever happens in future, he will never become the legitimately elected President of Ukraine." Tymoshenko did not call people into the streets to protest, and stated that she "won't tolerate civil confrontation."

On 10 February 2010, Yanukovych called on Tymoshenko to abandon her protests and resign as prime minister. Yanukovych stated he wanted to form a new coalition, and may try to call snap parliamentary elections. On 12 February, Yanukovych stated he would not rule out talks with Tymoshenko if she would publicly apologize to him for accusations she made during her election campaign. Tymoshenko's government did not want to resign voluntarily.

On 17 February 2010, the Higher Administrative Court of Ukraine suspended the results of the election on Tymoshenko's appeal. The court suspended the Central Election Commission of Ukraine ruling that announced that Yanukovych won the election. Tymoshenko withdrew her appeal on 20 February 2010, after the Higher Administrative Court in Kyiv rejected her petition to scrutinize documents from election districts in Crimea and to question election and law-enforcement officials. According to Tymoshenko, "It became clear that the court is not out to establish the truth, and, unfortunately, the court is as biased as the Central Election Commission, which includes a political majority from Yanukovych." Tymoshenko also stated, "At the very least there was rigging of votes using the main methods of falsification, and I think that for history this lawsuit with all the documentation will remain in the Higher Administrative Court of Ukraine, and sooner or later, an honest prosecutor's office and an honest court will assess that Yanukovych wasn't elected President of Ukraine, and that the will of the people had been rigged."

On 22 February 2010, Tymoshenko announced in a televised speech that she believed the presidential election to have been rigged and stated that she did not recognize its results. "As well as millions of Ukrainians, I state: Yanukovych is not our president", she said. She called on the democratic parliamentary factions not to seek "political employment" at the Party of Regions (meaning to avoid negotiations with the Party of Regions regarding the new coalition) and to "quit arguing and create a united team that would not let an anti-Ukrainian dictatorship usurp the power".

=== In opposition ===
==== Second dismissal from government ====
The falsifications decided the elections, not you. Like millions of Ukrainians, I assert that Yanukovych is not our president.

— PM Tymoshenko televised speech (22 February 2010)

During a nationally televised address on 22 February, Tymoshenko said of President-elect Yanukovych and "Yanukovych's team" (she referred to them in the speech as "The oligarchy"): "They need cheap labour, poor and disenfranchised people who can be forced to work at their factories for peanuts, they also need Ukraine's riches, which they have been stealing for the last 18 years." During the speech she also accused outgoing President Viktor Yushchenko of "opening the door to massive and flagrant election rigging" days before 7 February runoff of the January 2010 presidential election by amending the election law. During a Cabinet of Ministers meeting on 24 February, Tymoshenko stated, "The moment of truth has arrived: The decision whether or not to side with Yanukovych will show who values the preservation of Ukraine's independence and self-identity and who does not." Tymoshenko and her party, Bloc Yulia Tymoshenko, boycotted the inauguration ceremony of Yanukovych on 25 February 2010.

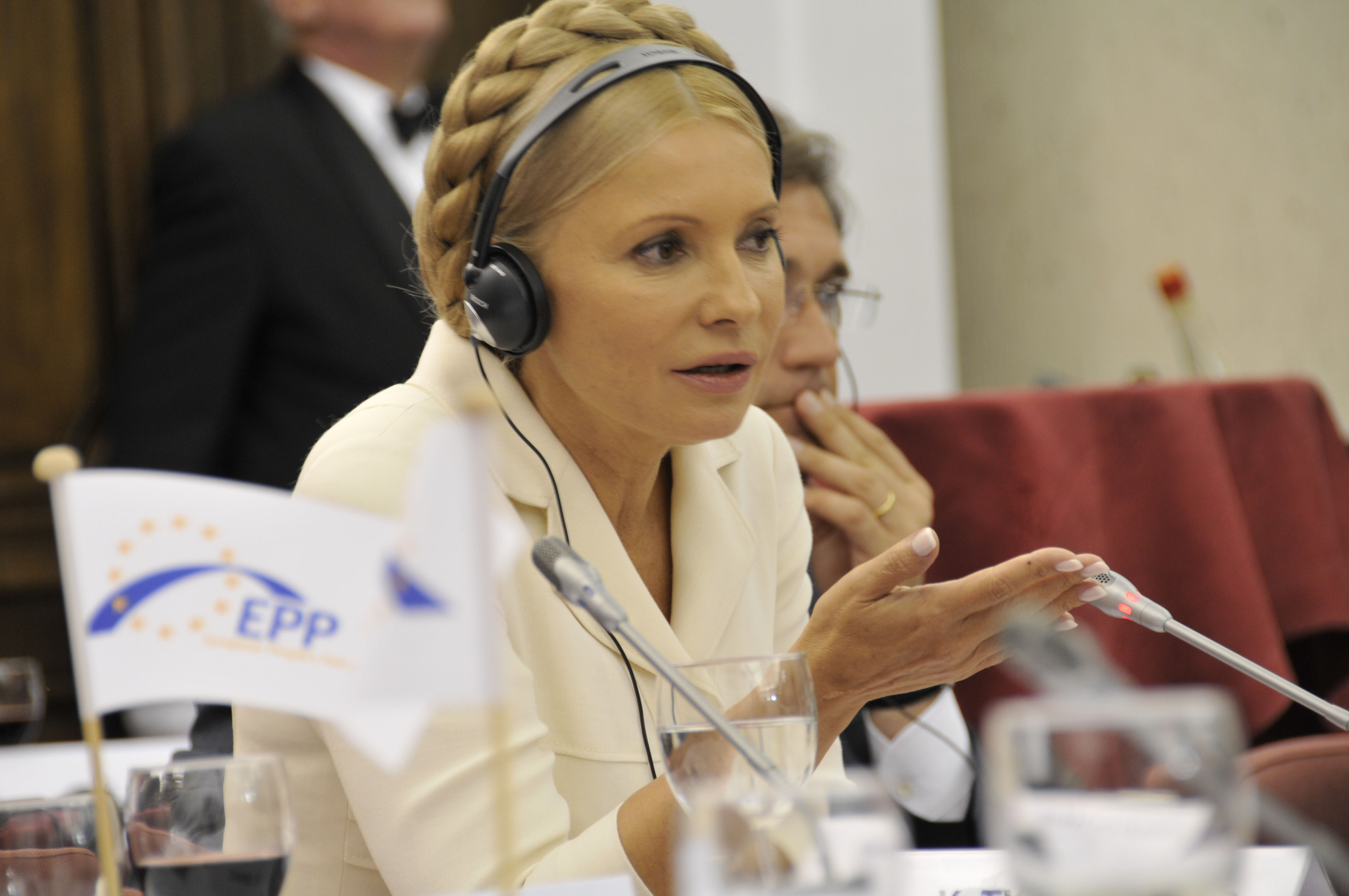
Tymoshenko in September 2010

If the Second Tymoshenko Government could not be preserved, Tymoshenko stated on 22 February 2010, she would go into Parliamentary opposition. On 3 March 2010, the Ukrainian Parliament passed a motion of no confidence in the second Tymoshenko Government in which the cabinet was dismissed with 243 lawmakers voting in favour out of 450 (including seven lawmakers of Bloc Yulia Tymoshenko). (Prime Minister Tymoshenko had demanded this vote herself on 1 March 2010.) On 2 March 2010, the coalition had already lost the parliamentary majority. Before the vote on 3 March, Tymoshenko again stated, "If the dismissal of the government is passed today, at that very same moment our government will leave the cabinet. Our political force will cross into the opposition." Tymoshenko blamed the Lytvyn Bloc and "Our Ukraine, including the leader of Our Ukraine, who announced the position of the faction" for the fall of the cabinet. Tymoshenko resigned from the prime minister post on 4 March 2010. Fellow BYuT member Oleksandr Turchynov was empowered to fulfill the prime minister's duties until a new government was formed on 4 March 2010. On 9 and 15 March 2010, Tymoshenko called on "all of the national patriotic forces" to unite against Yanukovych.

==== Criticism against government and reopening of criminal case ====
On 16 March, the shadow government including BYuT was established. On 10 May 2010, the People's Committee to Protect Ukraine was established, of which Tymoshenko is one of the representatives. Tymoshenko was against the 2010 Ukrainian-Russian Naval Base for Natural Gas treaty, as she believed the agreement harmed Ukraine's national interests.

Tymoshenko on renewed cases against her:

"This is a direct instruction from Yanukovych. This is purely political repression – this is obvious"

— Yulia Tymoshenko's press briefing on 12 May 2010

The initial case against Tymoshenko was reopened in Ukraine in May 2010, after Yanukovych came to power. On 12 May 2010, Ukraine's prosecutor's office illegally re-opened a 2004 criminal case, which had been closed by the Supreme Court of Ukraine in January 2005 against Tymoshenko regarding accusations that she had tried to bribe Supreme Court judges. As she left the prosecutor's office on 12 May, Tymoshenko told journalists she had been summoned to see investigators again on 17 May, and she linked the move to Russian President Medvedev's visit to Ukraine on 17 and 18 May 2010. Tymoshenko also claimed that she was told by "all the offices of the Prosecutor General's Office" that President Yanukovych had personally instructed the Prosecutor General's Office to find any grounds to prosecute her. In a press conference on 12 May, Yanukovych's representative in the Parliament, Yury Miroshnychenko, dismissed Tymoshenko's statement about Yanukovych's personal interest in prosecuting her. "Yanukovych is against political repression for criticism of the regime," Miroshnychenko stated.

The criminal cases against Tymoshenko prevented her from normal political activity and from international travel to her allies in the West. The European Parliament passed a resolution condemning the Yanukovych government for persecution of Tymoshenko as well as for prosecution in the "Gas case" and other cases against her and her ministers. On 30 December 2010, the US State Department informed the Ukrainian government of its concern, and indicated that "the prosecution of Tymoshenko should not be selective or politically motivated.

=== Second criminal persecution ===
==== "Kyoto affair" ====
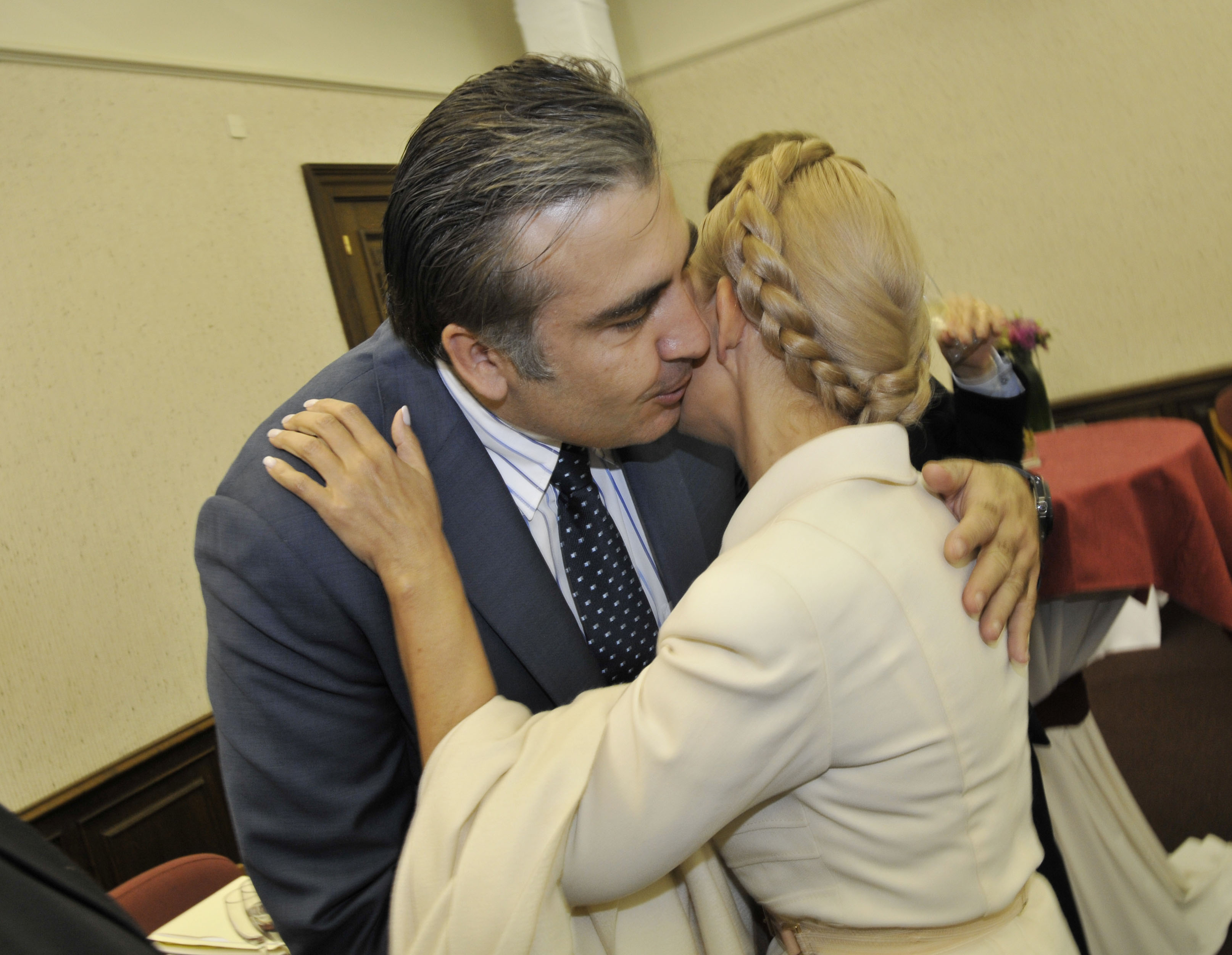
Tymoshenko and Mikheil Saakashvili, September 2010

On 15 December 2010, the General Prosecutor's Office instituted a criminal case against Tymoshenko, alleging that she misused funds received by Ukraine within the framework of the Kyoto Protocol. She was officially charged on 20 December 2010. Tymoshenko denied the money had been spent on pensions, insisting it was still at the disposal of the environment ministry. She called the investigation against her a witch-hunt. According to government officials, the criminal case against Tymoshenko was a legitimate attempt to uncover corruption by the previous administration. In the case of "Kyoto money" American experts "Covington & Burling" and "BDO USA" stated the following: "the Documents that we were able to see, clearly point out that the Kyoto Target balance account in the amount of approximately 3.3 billion on the date of receipt remained unchanged throughout the period that is considered, and that, moreover, Kyoto funds have not been touched at all in 2009. Since the balance of this account remained unchanged on the date of receipt, any accusations that Prime Minister Tymoshenko "used" these funds contrary to their intended purpose, are obviously false". On 7 August 2014, the Chairman of the State Treasury service Tatiana Slyuz confirmed that the Tymoshenko government has never spent "Kyoto money", the funds were on special accounts and in 2010 were transferred to the Yanukovych government. Tymoshenko was not arrested, but ordered not to leave Kyiv while the inquiry was under way. In the same case, the environment minister in the second Tymoshenko Government, Georgiy Filipchuk, was detained. Filipchuk was the third minister from this government to face criminal charges since its fall in March 2010 (prosecutors charged former Interior Minister Yuriy Lutsenko with abuse of office in early December 2010, and former economy minister Bohdan Danylyshyn was detained in the Czech Republic in October 2010 on similar charges). Lawmakers of BYuT blocked the rostrum and presidium of the Verkhovna Rada the next day in protest against this. That same day, the European People's Party issued a statement in which it "condemns the growth of aggressive, politically motivated pressure by the Ukrainian authorities on the opposition and its leader Yulia Tymoshenko." Tymoshenko dismissed the probe as "terror against the opposition by President Yanukovych." Earlier that month, Ukraine's Prosecutor General Viktor Pshonka had stated that there were no political reasons for the interrogations of the opposition leaders Tymoshenko, Lutsenko and Oleksandr Turchynov.

==== New charges ====
New corruption charges against Tymoshenko were filed on 27 January 2011. She was accused of using 1,000 medical vehicles for campaigning in the presidential elections of 2010. According to Tymoshenko, the charges were false and part of "Yanukovych's campaign to silence the opposition." Subsequently, in 2010, the results of the audit of the accounts chamber revealed that the acquisition of these vehicles was provided for from 2008 in the article 87 of the Budget code, the State budget-2009 and article 13 of the Law of Ukraine "On state target programs". In June 2011, the case on the "Kyoto money" and of medical assistance vehicles to the village were suspended — after auditing company "BDO USA", which has branches in over one hundred countries around the world, and a large law firm "Covington & Burling" investigated these cases and stated that they "are not worth the paper on which they are written."

A third criminal case against Tymoshenko in connection with alleged abuse of power during the 2009 Russia–Ukraine gas dispute was opened on 10 April 2011. This case was labelled "absurd" by Tymoshenko. On 24 May 2011, prosecutors charged her in connection with this (third criminal) case. She was not arrested.

==== Continued opposition to government ====
On 26 April 2011, Tymoshenko sued businessman Dmytro Firtash and Swiss-based RosUkrEnergo in a US District Court in Manhattan, accusing them of "defrauding Ukraine's citizenry by manipulating an arbitration court ruling" and "undermining the rule of law in Ukraine" in connection with a 2010 international arbitration court ruling in Stockholm that ordered Ukraine's state energy company Naftogaz to pay RosUkrEnergo 11 billion cubic meters (bcm) of natural gas to compensate for fuel it had "expropriated" plus 1.1 billion bcm as a penalty.

Throughout Yanukovych's presidency, Tymoshenko stayed very critical of his and the Azarov Government's performances and intentions which, among others, she accused of selling out to Russia and of being a "funeral of democracy." Tymoshenko has accused "many of Ukraine's neighbours" of turning a blind eye to "Yanukovych's strangulation of Ukraine's democracy, some openly celebrate the supposed 'stability' that his regime has imposed." She believes "Ukraine can return to a democratic path of development only with an active civil society and support from the international community."

=== New criminal cases and imprisonment ===
==== "Gas case" trial ====
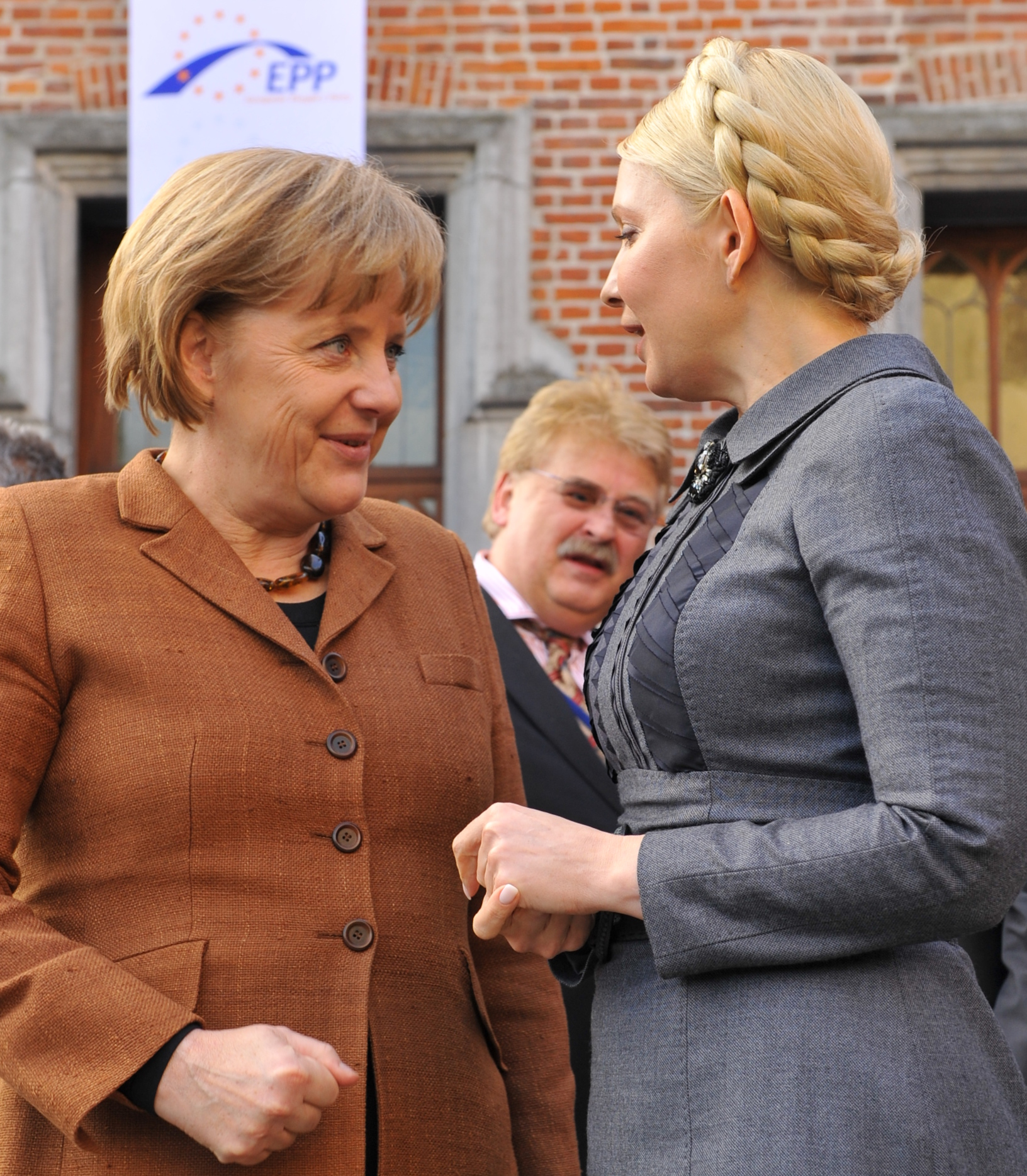
Tymoshenko and Chancellor Angela Merkel at a March 2011 European People's Party summit in Brussels; the General Prosecutor of Ukraine's Office lifted the travel ban imposed on Tymoshenko after U.S. Senator John McCain and European People's Party President Wilfried Martens officially invited her to this event.

On 24 June 2011, a trial started in the "gas case", concerning a contract signed in 2009 with Gazprom to supply natural gas to Ukraine. Tymoshenko was charged with abuse of power and embezzlement, as the court found the deal anti-economic for the country and abusive.

Tymoshenko's trial (she was charged in May 2011) for abuse of office concerning a natural gas imports contract signed with Russia in January 2009 started on 24 June 2011 in Kyiv. A number of criminal cases were also opened against former officials from the second Tymoshenko Government. (Note: These criminal cases were opened against officials from the second Tymoshenko Government (prosecutors have not accused them of corruption, or assignment of funds, but rather have accused them of abuse of power): 1. Prime minister – Tymoshenko; 2. Minister of Police – Yuriy Lutsenko; 3. Minister of Defence – Valeriy Ivashchenko; 4. Minister of Finance – Bohdan Danylyshyn; 5. Minister of Natural Resources – Heorhiy Filipchuk; 6. Deputy Minister of Justice – Yevhen Korniychuk; 7. Head of Customs of Ukraine – Anatoliy Makarenko; 8. Head of the regional customs – Shepitko; 9. Head of the State Treasury of Ukraine – Tetiana Sliuz; Deputy head – Gritsoun; 10. Deputy head of "Naftogaz" (state monopoly on trade in gas and oil) – Ihor Mykolayovych Didenko; 11. Governor of Dnipropetrovsk region (former Minister of Transport) – Viktor Bondar; 12. Minister and former mayor of Lviv – Vasyl Kuybida. Source: Minister and former mayor of Lviv – Kuybida; 13. First Deputy Prime Minister Oleksandr Turchynov – repeatedly summoned for questioning) According to Yanukovych, those cases were indiscriminately made to fight corruption in Ukraine. Former President Yushchenko testified against Tymoshenko during the trial, which he called "a normal judicial process." The trial against Tymoshenko has been referred to as "selective justice" and "political persecution" in statements by the U.S., Russia, United Kingdom, Germany, Italy, Spain and other European countries; in statements by the European Union, NATO, the European People's Party; and in statements by human rights organizations such as Transparency International, Freedom House, Amnesty International and Human Rights Watch. Following her conviction, Tymoshenko remained under criminal investigation for ten criminal acts; Ukrainian prosecutors have claimed Tymoshenko committed even more criminal acts.

==== New investigations and prison sentence ====
Early in July 2011, the Ukrainian security service (SBU) opened a new criminal investigation into alleged non-delivery of goods by United Energy Systems of Ukraine (in 1996) to Russia for $405.5 million, the SBU maintains that Russia may claim this sum to the State budget of Ukraine (this criminal case was closed in Russia in December 2005 due to lapse of time).

On 11 October 2011, the court found Tymoshenko guilty of abuse of power and sentenced her to seven years in prison, banned her from seeking elected office for her period of imprisonment, and ordered her to pay the state $188 million. She was convicted for exceeding her powers as prime minister by ordering Naftogaz to sign the gas deal with Russia in 2009. Tymoshenko did appeal the sentence, which she compared to Stalin's Great Terror, on 24 October 2011.

A 2001 criminal case on state funds embezzlement and tax evasion charges against Tymoshenko was reopened in Ukraine on 24 October 2011. On 4 November 2011, the Ukrainian tax police resumed four criminal cases against Tymoshenko. She was charged for these cases on 10 November 2011. Tymoshenko was re-arrested (while in prison) on 8 December 2011, after a Ukrainian court ordered her indefinite arrest as part of the investigation of alleged tax evasion and theft of government funds (between 1996 and 2000) by United Energy Systems of Ukraine. Again, the EU showed concern over this.

On 23 December 2011, Tymoshenko lost her appeal against her sentence for abuse of power. She and her lawyers had boycotted the appeal proceedings, claiming that the "judicial system and justice are totally non-existent in Ukraine today." Tymoshenko lodged a complaint against the verdict at the European Court of Human Rights, which was given priority treatment by the court. On 30 December 2011, Tymoshenko was transferred to the Kachanivska penal colony in Kharkiv.

==== Appeal ====
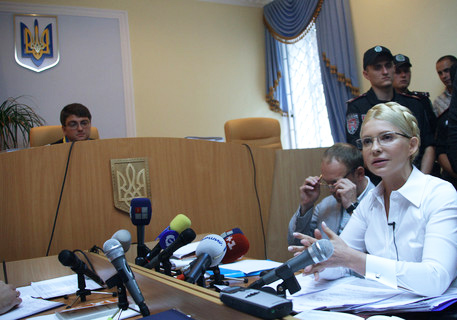
Yulia Tymoshenko during her trial in 2011

On 24 October 2011, Tymoshenko filed an appeal to the decision of Pechersk district court of Kyiv regarding the "gas case". On 1 December, the Kyiv Court of Appeal started hearing the case. Tymoshenko herself was not present in the courtroom because of her health condition. After the hearing, the judge, Olena Sitaylo, had to call an ambulance and was hospitalized. On 13 December 2011, the Kyiv Court of Appeal resumed the hearing. All subsequent court sessions took place without Tymoshenko's presence. Immediately prior to the hearing of the appeal, the board of judges was altered: Sitaylo, the chief justice, was appointed the day before the first hearing; other justices were appointed several days prior to the court session. Thus, the judges did not have time to study the 84-page case log. The manner of the process proved that the decision to alter the board of judges was made beforehand. At the very end, Tymoshenko's defense boycotted the court session.

On 23 December 2011, the Kyiv Court of Appeal issued a ruling which fully supported the verdict of the Pechersk court. The judges did not find any violations during the pre-trial investigation or trial on the "gas case", overruling the claims of Tymoshenko's defense.

==== Cassation ====
On 26 January 2012, Tymoshenko's defense submitted a cassation appeal to the High Specialized Court for Civil and Criminal Cases regarding the "gas case" verdict. On 16 August 2012, after a 7-month delay that impeded filing the case to the European Court of Human Rights, the panel of judges of the aforementioned court began hearing the case. The panel finished hearing the case on 21 August and went to the jury room to make decision. The ruling of the Court, issued on 29 August 2012, stated that the appeal of former prime minister Yulia Tymoshenko's defense on the "gas case" should not be satisfied.

Media, diplomats, members of parliament and members of an EU special monitoring mission, Pat Cox and Aleksander Kwaśniewski, attended the court sessions. The ruling was announced on the day following public hearing of "Tymoshenko vs Ukraine" (regarding unlawful arrest of ex-prime minister and holding her in custody) case at the European Court of Human Rights.

The European Union, PACE, and governments of the United States, Great Britain and Canada expressed frustration with the cassation ruling. "We are deeply disappointed with the consequences of the current situation, when two important opposition leaders cannot stand in the upcoming parliamentary elections, [and] when the court disrespects international standards for fair and transparent processes", a representative of the European Commission, Michael Mann, said in Brussels on 29 August 2012.

==== Continued prosecution ====
In early January 2012, Tymoshenko's husband Oleksandr was granted asylum in the Czech Republic, which he had requested at the end of the previous year.

In early April 2012, the General Prosecutor's Office began examining the possible involvement of Tymoshenko and former prime minister Pavlo Lazarenko in the murder of Donetsk businessman Olexandr Momot in 1996.

A trial concerning alleged misappropriating public funds of United Energy Systems of Ukraine started on 19 April 2012 in Kharkiv. Tymoshenko refused to attend the trial, citing problems with her health. Tymoshenko was then moved against her will from Kachanivska prison to a hospital where she began a hunger strike on 20 April to protest – according to her lawyer Serhiy Vlasenko – "what is happening in the country and what is happening to her in prison." She ended the hunger strike on 9 May 2012. Beginning on 9 May 2012, she received treatment at the hospital after being diagnosed with a spinal disc herniation.

The Supreme Court of Ukraine upheld the verdict against Tymoshenko on 29 August 2012.

On 18 January 2013, Tymoshenko was notified that she was a suspect in the murder of businessman and lawmaker Yevhen Shcherban, his wife and two other people in 1996. In May 2013, the Shcherban murder case was suspended.

==== Political activities in prison ====
From 29 October to 16 November 2012, Tymoshenko was again on a hunger strike to protest vote rigging in the October 2012 Ukrainian parliamentary election.

Fatherland United Opposition nominated Tymoshenko as its candidate for the Ukrainian presidential elections of 2015 on 7 December 2012. On 14 June 2013, the congress of her party approved the decision to nominate her as its candidate in the 2015 Ukrainian presidential election. (Note: In December 2010 Tymoshenko had stated she might run for President in 2015, but that this also depended on her family.)

From 25 November to 6 December 2013 (during the Euromaidan protests), Tymoshenko was again on a hunger strike in protest of "President Yanukovych's reluctance to sign the DCFTA" on 6 December.

==== International reactions ====
The "gas case" trial was viewed by many European and American organizations as a politically charged persecution that violates the law. The EU and multiple international organizations see the conviction as "justice being applied selectively under political motivation."

In June 2012, the European Parliament established a special monitoring mission to Ukraine, conducted by former European Parliament President Pat Cox and former Polish President Aleksander Kwaśniewski. Both politicians observed trials, repeatedly visited Tymoshenko in custody and conducted meetings with Ukraine's authorities regarding her release.

The European Union shelved the European Union Association Agreement and Deep and Comprehensive Free Trade Agreement with the Ukrainian government over the issue.

On 30 April 2013, the European Court of Human Rights issued a judgment asserting that "Ms. Tymoshenko's pre-trial detention had been arbitrary; that the lawfulness of her detention had not been properly reviewed; and, that she had no possibility to seek compensation for her unlawful deprivation of liberty."

Parliamentary Assembly of the Council of Europe (PACE) has adopting a resolution on "Keeping political and criminal responsibility separate" in which former prime minister of Ukraine Yulia Tymoshenko is recognized as a political prisoner.

The United States Senate passed two resolutions calling for the release from prison of former prime minister Tymoshenko. The most recent, presented in the Senate in June 2013, called for Tymoshenko's release in light of the recent European Court of Human Rights ruling, and was adopted on 18 November 2013. An earlier resolution, passed in 2012, condemned the politically motivated prosecution and imprisonment of former prime minister of Ukraine Yulia Tymoshenko.

On 2 October 2013, the PACE adopted a resolution calling for the immediate release of Tymoshenko and, two days later, Pat Cox and Aleksander Kwaśniewski, representatives of the European Parliament mission, handed president Yanukovych a petition to pardon Tymoshenko.

==== Aftermath – Manafort case ====
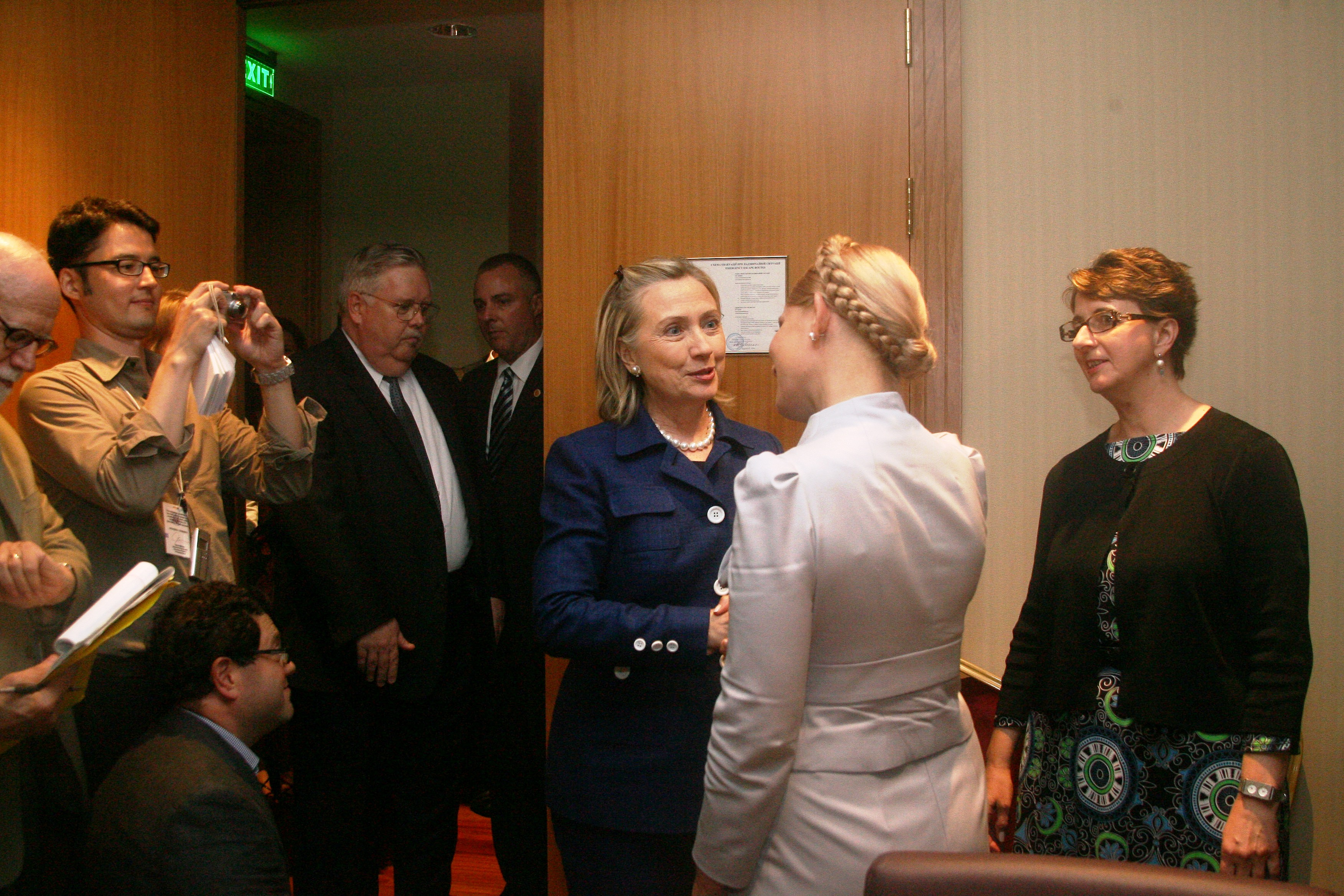
Meeting between Tymoshenko and US Secretary of State Hillary Clinton (Kyiv, June 2, 2010)

According to the September 2018 indictment in which Paul Manafort confessed as part of a plea bargain with U.S. special prosecutor Robert Mueller, Manafort and his partner Tony Podesta, brother of Hillary Clinton's campaign manager John Podesta, helped the former Ukrainian President Yanukovych to conduct a media campaign in the West directed against Tymoshenko in order to undermine the support for her by the administration of then U.S. President Barack Obama. In exchange for his testimony against Manafort, Mueller gave Tony Podesta and The Podesta Group complete amnesty, including not prosecuting them for being unregistered agents of a foreign government.

The campaign was designed to make Tymoshenko look like a supporter of antisemitism. The indictment also states that in July 2011, former U.S. journalist Alan Friedman sent Manafort a confidential six-page document entitled "Ukraine – the digital road map", which contained a plan for "destruction" of Tymoshenko using video, articles and social networks. The plan included creating a website, posting on the Internet, and sending out e-mails to "the target audience in Europe and the U.S." It was also proposed to edit the page of Yulia Tymoshenko in Wikipedia in order to emphasize the "corruption and legal proceedings" related to her.

=== Release and rehabilitation ===
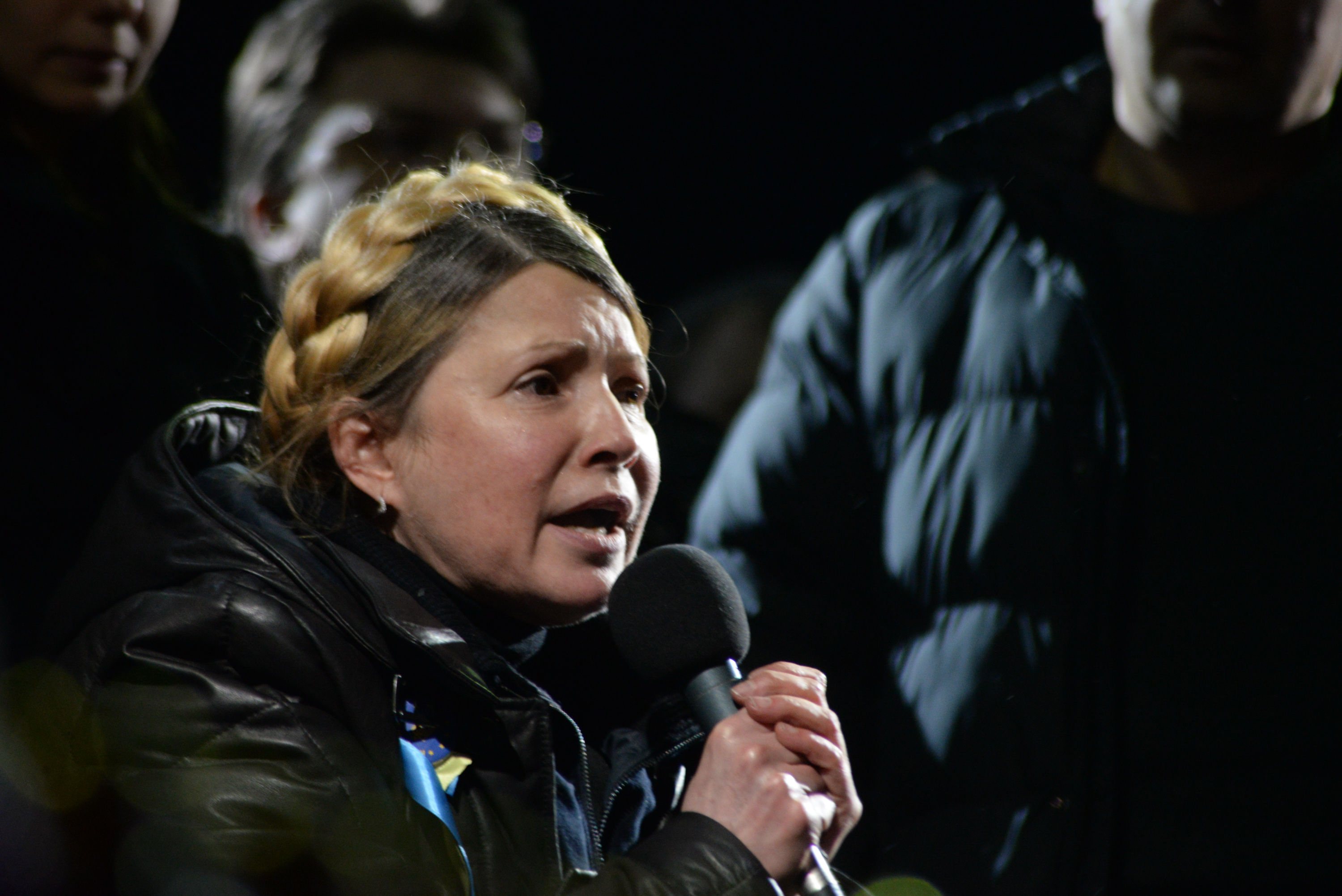
Tymoshenko addressing Euromaidan with a speech, Kyiv, 22 February 2014

Following the Revolution of Dignity, on 21 February 2014, Parliament voted for Tymoshenko's release in a 310–54 veto-proof vote. To do so, the members of parliament decriminalized the Article on which Tymoshenko was charged and brought it into compliance with Article 19 of the UN Convention against corruption. That could enable immediate release of Tymoshenko through the corresponding court ruling. However, Viktor Yanukovych fled the country after massive violent clashes in Kyiv that killed more than 80 people without signing the bill into law. On 22 February 2014, the Verkhovna Rada with 322 votes adopted a decree based on the decision of the European Court of Human Rights and corresponding decision of the Committee of Ministers of the Council of Europe.

On the same day, Tymoshenko was released from Central Clinical Hospital No. 5 in Kharkiv, where she had been receiving treatment under police guard since May 2012, after being diagnosed with a spinal disc herniation. Her release was praised by Western leaders.

On 28 February 2014, the parliament rehabilitated Yulia Tymoshenko and restored her rights. That enabled her to run for office; however, she has ruled out becoming prime minister again.

Kyivsky District Court of Kharkiv closed the criminal case on financial abuse of the United Energy Systems of Ukraine on 28 February 2014. And, on 14 April, the Supreme Court of Ukraine closed the "gas case" against Tymoshenko for "absence of a criminal act".

On 25 April 2014, the General Prosecutor of Ukraine launched a pre-trial investigation against a number of officials from its own office and the Pechersky district court and Kyiv's court of appeals (the judges who had sentenced Tymoshenko) because of allegedly "deliberate, systematic and flagrant violation of accused Yulia Tymoshenko's rights to defense, which are granted by Ukraine's current laws".

On 24 June 2014, the Supreme Court of Ukraine rehabilitated Tymoshenko.

On 22 January 2015, the European Court of Human Rights announced the termination of consideration of the case of Yulia Tymoshenko v. Ukraine in connection to an implied friendly settlement between the parties, after Tymoshenko's agreement with the government's declaration admitting that the criminal prosecution against her had been politically motivated. The Ukrainian government, in its exchange with the Court, had acknowledged a violation of Tymoshenko's rights guaranteed by the European Convention on Human Rights under articles 3 (prohibition of torture), 6 (right to a fair trial), 7 (no punishment without law), 8 (right to respect for private and family life), partly in conjunction with article 13 (right to an effective remedy), article 18 (political motivation), article 10 (freedom of expression) and article 4 of Protocol No. 7 to the convention (right not to be tried or punished twice). Taking note of the Ukrainian government's declaration and following measures, as well as of Tymoshenko's agreement with it, the Court struck out the application from its list of cases, as asked by the government, following article 39 of the convention (friendly settlements).

On 19 October 2015, the Kominternivskyi district court of Kharkiv has sentenced two former employees of the Kachanivska penal colony No. 54 to three years in prison for inflicting injuries on Tymoshenko.

=== Renewed political activities ===
==== First steps after release ====
Immediately after her release from prison on 22 February 2014, Yulia Tymoshenko travelled to Kyiv, where she attended a makeshift memorial to the first slain protesters on Hrushevskoho Street and gave a speech on Maidan stage. In the following days, she had a number of meetings and phone conversations with USA, EU, and OSCE officials. Tymoshenko addressed the European Union, leaders of western democracies and of countries which guaranteed Ukraine's territorial unity according to the Budapest Memorandum; she called for action to stop what she called the "Russian aggression".

From 6 to 7 March, Tymoshenko attended a political conference of the European People's Party in Dublin, where she openly discussed events with Angela Merkel, Jose Manuel Barroso, Viviane Reding, Michel Barnier, Mariano Rajoy and Donald Tusk, amongst other notable figures. On 7 March 2014, she was admitted to the Charité hospital in Berlin, Germany, for treatment of her severe back problems.

Upon her return to Kyiv, Tymoshenko gathered military and defense experts and suggested launching a special headquarters that would elaborate responses to threats coming from Russia.

==== 2014 presidential campaign ====
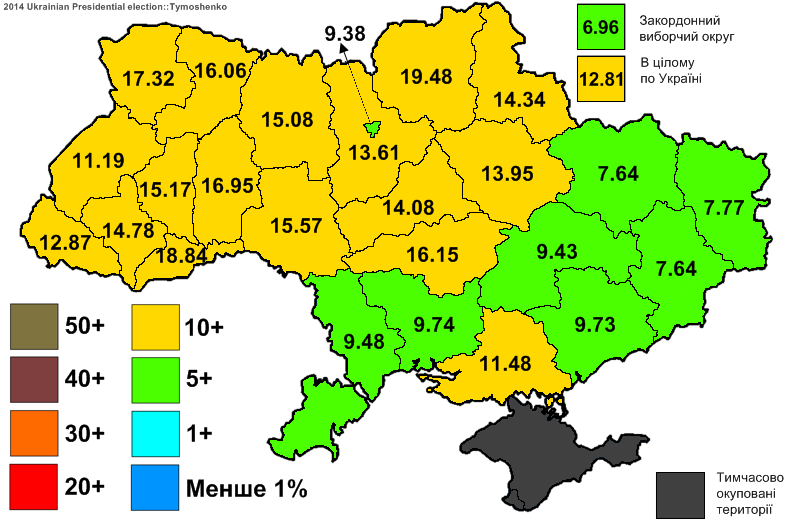
2014 presidential election percentage of vote for Tymoshenko

On 27 March 2014, at a press conference in Kyiv, Tymoshenko stated that she would run in the 2014 presidential election. Two days later, the congress of Batkivshchyna party, which took place on Sofia Maidan, officially nominated her and on 31 March the Central Election Commission officially registered her as a candidate.

The key theses of Tymoshenko's pre-election program were the eradication of corruption, the fight against oligarchs, the European path of Ukraine's development (in particular, the signing of the Association Agreement with the EU), countering Russian aggression, and restoring Ukraine's territorial integrity.

In order to win the presidential elections and the subsequent political struggle, Tymoshenko hired political technologist Tal Zilbershtein, who once advised ex-Prime Minister of Israel Ehud Olmert, to her team.

The election took place on 25 May. Tymoshenko came a distant second behind Petro Poroshenko, receiving 12.39% of the vote.

==== 2014 parliamentary campaign ====
On 30 August 2014, Tymoshenko announced her Batkivshchina party would start gathering signatures to trigger a referendum on NATO accession.

In the 2014 Ukrainian parliamentary election, "Fatherland" received 5.68% of the vote and 19 seats in parliament. In the elections, Tymoshenko was placed second on the parties electoral list, after Nadiya Savchenko. After the election, Tymoshenko again became faction leader. She is a member of the Committee of the Verkhovna Rada on issues of European integration in the 8th convocation of parliament.

After the election, Tymoshenko began reforming the Batkivshchyna party.

==== Parliamentary activities in 2014–2018 ====
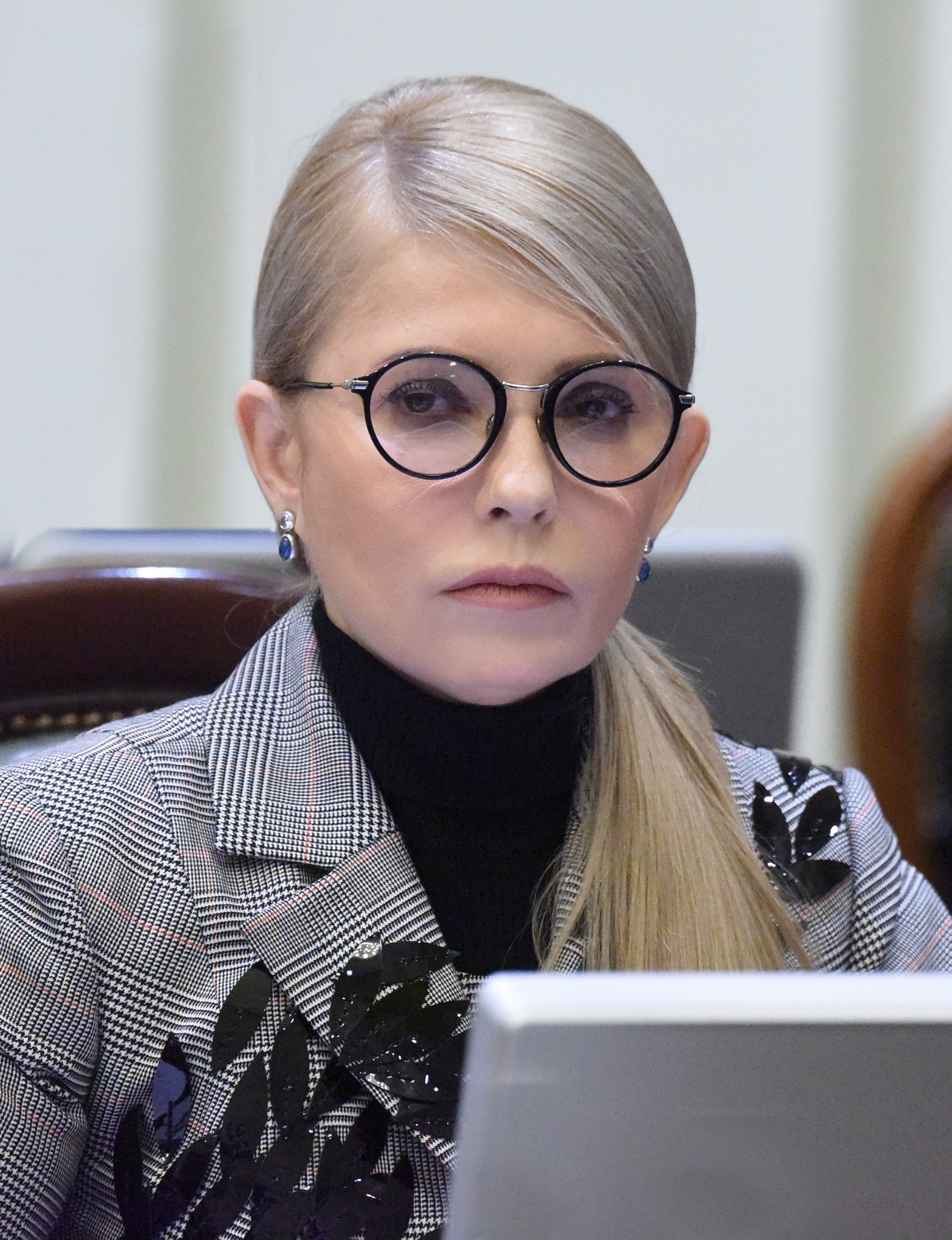
Tymoshenko in 2018

On 11 December 2014, the Rada supported Tymoshenko's initiative on freeing Nadiya Savchenko.

On 5 March 2015, Parliament supported a bill to support the volunteer movement in Ukraine.

On 21 April 2015, Tymoshenko initiated a working group to check the validity of utility tariffs.

On 6 April 2016, Tymoshenko thanked Angela Merkel for her help in establishing peace in eastern Ukraine.

15 May 2016: Faction "Fatherland" preparing a statement in the name of the new Prosecutor General in connection with offenses in the activities of the National Commission, which performs state regulation in the energy and utilities relative to the unjustified increase of gas prices for the population.

16 May 2016: Yulia Tymoshenko held a meeting with the coordinator of the US State Department on the issue of sanctions, Ambassador Dan Fried. The sides discussed the situation in Eastern Ukraine and Crimea, focusing on the politics of U.S. sanctions against Russia. Dan Fried assured Tymoshenko of the support of the United States of America for Ukraine, and its territorial integrity and independence.

23 May 2016: At the initiative of Yulia Tymoshenko All-Ukrainian Union "Fatherland" launched a website "Fair rates", the proceedings of which explain the need to establish adequate tariffs for gas for the population.

Tymoshenko is in favor of extending the moratorium on land sales and supporting farmers.

She considers negotiations in the format of the Budapest Memorandum to be an effective way to resolve the issue of the war in Donbass.

=== 2019 elections and aftermath ===
==== Presidential campaign ====
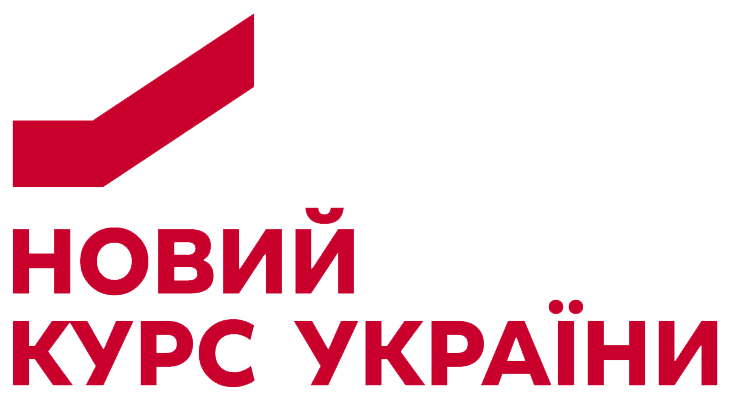
Logo of Tymoshenko's "New Course" media campaign

The New Deal of Ukraine was an election program for the post of President of Ukraine, which was presented on 15 June 2018, by the leader of the "Fatherland" party, Yulia Tymoshenko. The program provided for amendments to the Constitution of Ukraine.

The program contained four blocks:

1. New social contract
2. New economic course
3. New World Strategy
4. Ecosystem of human life

On 20 June 2018, Tymoshenko announced that she would take part in the 2019 Ukrainian presidential election. She was a heavy favorite in the polls until early 2019. Two weeks before the election, candidate Serhiy Taruta pledged his campaign-team would support Tymoshenko's campaign efforts (however, his name was not taken off the ballot, the deadline to withdraw having been exceeded). On 8 February 2019, a new presidential candidate was registered with the same surname and initials as Yulia Tymoshenko – the non-factional people's deputy Yury V. Tymoshenko. It was done with the intention that the voters, especially older people, would make a mistake on the ballot. Tymoshenko herself called it a "dirty" move by Poroshenko]

For a long period before the start of the election campaign, Tymoshenko was the leader of opinion polls. The situation changed after the actor Volodymyr Zelenskyy's New Year's announcement of his intention to run for president, after which it was Zelenskyy who began to gain a rating, beating Tymoshenko at the end of January 2019. Later, during the entire election campaign, Tymoshenko shared 2–3 positions in the rating together with the current President Petro Poroshenko.

The first round of the election was held on 31 March 2019. With 13.4% of the vote, Tymoshenko came in third behind Zelenskyy (30.2%) and the incumbent Poroshenko (15.9%). While she conceded defeat, she also accused Poroshenko of manipulating the results.

==== 2019 parliamentary election ====
In the 2019 parliamentary election, she led the "Fatherland" list which came in third, with 8.18% of the vote and 26 seats in parliament, in ahead of European Solidarity list led by Poroshenko (8.10%).

==== 2020 local elections ====
According to the results of the CEC, Tymoshenko's party received 4093 deputy mandates (12.39%) and became one of the leading parties in the 2020 local elections in Ukraine.

=== Parliamentary and political activities (2019–2021) ===
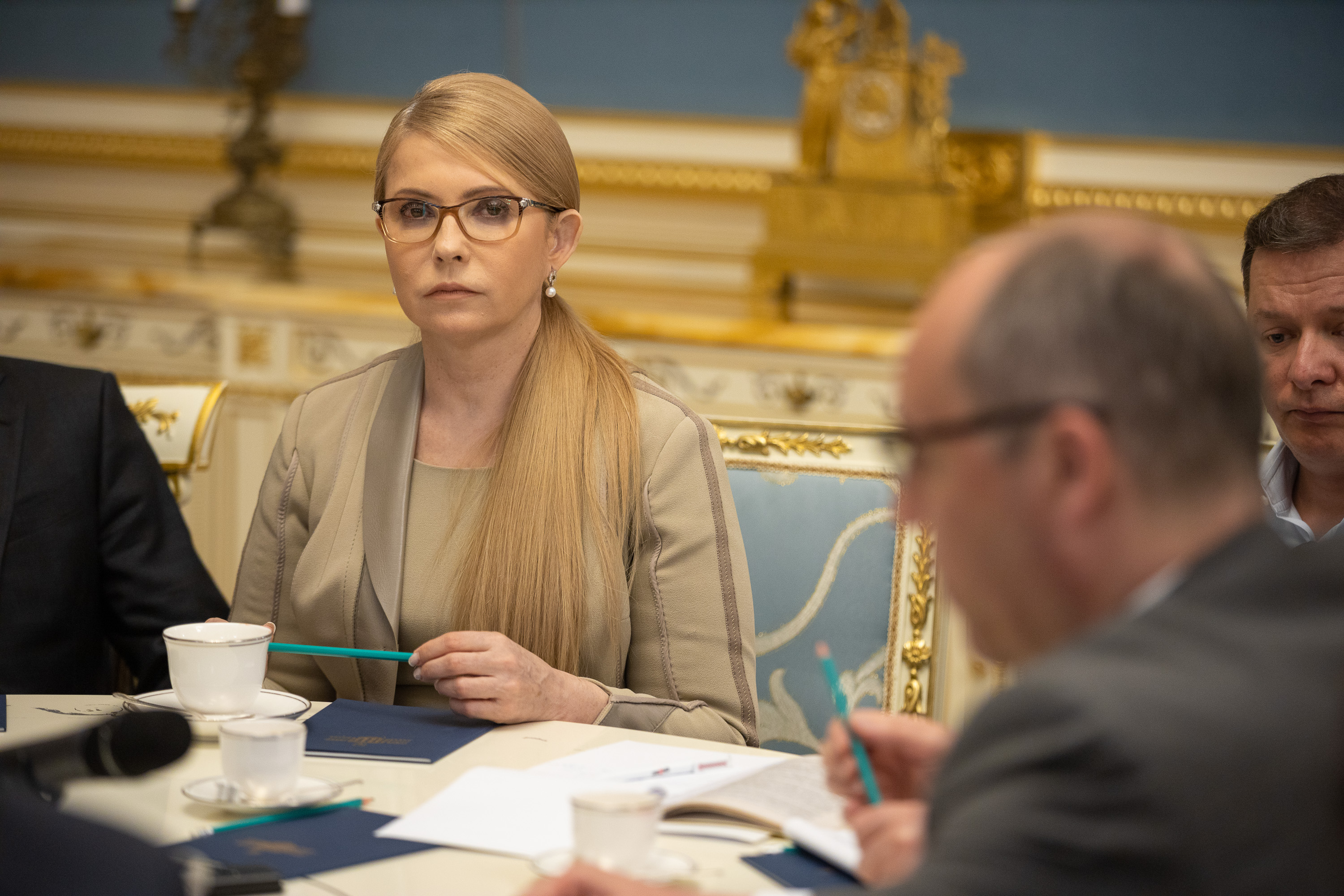
Yulia Tymoshenko, 21 May 2019

In the 2019 parliamentary election, she led the Batkivshchyna list which came in third, with 8.18% of the vote and 26 seats in parliament. Tymoshenko became a member of the Parliamentary Committee on Social Policy and Protection of Veterans' Rights. Tymoshenko's activities in this session of the Rada focussed on opposition to lifting the moratorium on land sales and pushing for government action to lower energy prices.

At the start of the term, Tymoshenko's party supported a number of measures put forward by the ruling Servant of the People party. On the first day of the new session of the Rada, Tymoshenko's party supported the bill on lifting parliamentary immunity. On 3 September 2019, the Batkivshchyna party supported the referral to the Constitutional Court of a bill to reduce the number of deputies.

However, in November 2019, after the parliament passed a bill to lift the moratorium on land sales, Yulia Tymoshenko announced her transition to opposition to the ruling Servant of the People party. On 18 November 2019, Tymoshenko appealed to the Constitutional Court to immediately consider the petition for the bill on the "land market". In December 2019, Tymoshenko united more than 40 political and public organizations that oppose the sale of land in the National Headquarters for the Protection of Native Land. On 15 December 2019, the National Headquarters approved demands to President Volodymyr Zelenskyy that it be necessary to postpone the adoption of "land laws", extend the moratorium and announce a referendum. The National Corps also joined the all-Ukrainian protest action initiated by the National Headquarters for the Protection of the Motherland. On 19 December 2019, Yulia Tymoshenko and Batkivshchyna deputies addressed the National Anti-Corruption Bureau of Ukraine with a statement pointing to conflicts of interest and corruption in the Parliamentary Committee on Agrarian Policy during the consideration of the law on land sales.

In November 2020, Tymoshenko's party supported the all-Ukrainian SaveFOP campaign by registering Bill 3853–2 to simplify the taxation system for small businesses. Tymoshenko signed a memorandum of cooperation with the public movement SaveFOP.

On 11 January 2021, Tymoshenko called on the authorities to provide Ukrainians with gas at a price no higher than the purchase price. According to Tymoshenko, the price of gas should not exceed ₴3, in this regard, Batkivshchyna registered Bill No. 1177 in the Verkhovna Rada. On 27 January, Tymoshenko initiated a referendum on five issues: the supply of Ukrainian gas and nuclear electricity to the population with a 30% profitability; on the sale of agricultural land; on the sale of strategic property; the issue of legalization of cannabis; about the gambling business. At the same time, Zelenskyy criticized Tymoshenko's referendum, although he himself initiated a nationwide poll on 5 issues, as well as the strengthening of democracy in Ukraine. On 1 March, the Batkivshchyna party demanded that the Government stop importing electricity from Russia and Belarus to Ukraine and launch an investigation into the matter. According to Tymoshenko, the import of Belarusian and Russian electricity threatens the national security of the country.

In June, Tymoshenko took part in a meeting of the All-Ukrainian People's Council on holding a referendum against the sale of agricultural land. On 21 July, Tymoshenko announced that the Batkivshchyna party had drafted a new Constitution of Ukraine, which provided for the division of power into four branches of government: legislative, executive, judicial, and control. In September, Tymoshenko called on the Verkhovna Rada to adopt bill No. 4680, which provides for the supply of domestically produced gas to Ukrainian citizens at a low price/ On 28 September, Tymoshenko registered in the Verkhovna Rada a Draft Resolution "On the Creation of a Temporary Investigative Commission to Investigate the Activities of NJSC Naftogaz". On 23 October, Tymoshenko registered in the Verkhovna Rada a draft resolution "On urgent measures to overcome an emergency level crisis that has developed as a result of an increase in energy prices" and a draft law "On Amendments to the Tax Code of Ukraine on the introduction of a reduced value added tax rate on energy carriers and related services". On 26 October, Tymoshenko handed over medical equipment for patients with coronavirus to the Oleksandrivska Clinical Hospital in Kyiv.

=== Parliamentary and political activities (2022–present) ===
On 27 January 2022, the Verkhovna Rada adopted a resolution initiated by Tymoshenko to establish a Temporary Commission of Inquiry to investigate possible corruption that caused significant losses to the revenue side of the state budget, in particular as a result of NJSC Naftogaz. Tymoshenko became a member of this VSC. On 20 June, the Batkivshchyna faction, led by Yulia Tymoshenko, announced its opposition the ratification of the Istanbul Convention. Tymoshenko believes that the Istanbul Convention is not included in the package of requirements of the EU for granting Ukraine a candidate. She noted that the Verkhovna Rada went against the will of Ukrainians, because such an important issue should be determined at a national referendum. On 19 July, deputies of the Batkivshchyna faction prevented the theft of 264 billion hryvnias from the budget, which Naftogaz of Ukraine was supposed to spend on an opaque scheme for financing the purchase of natural gas for the next heating season. On 29 July during a working visit to Japan, Tymoshenko discussed the situation in Ukraine with Tokyo Governor Yuriko Koike. On the same day, Tymoshenko spoke at a conference in Tokyo and called for the creation of a new stable security order in the world.

==== 2022 Russian invasion of Ukraine ====
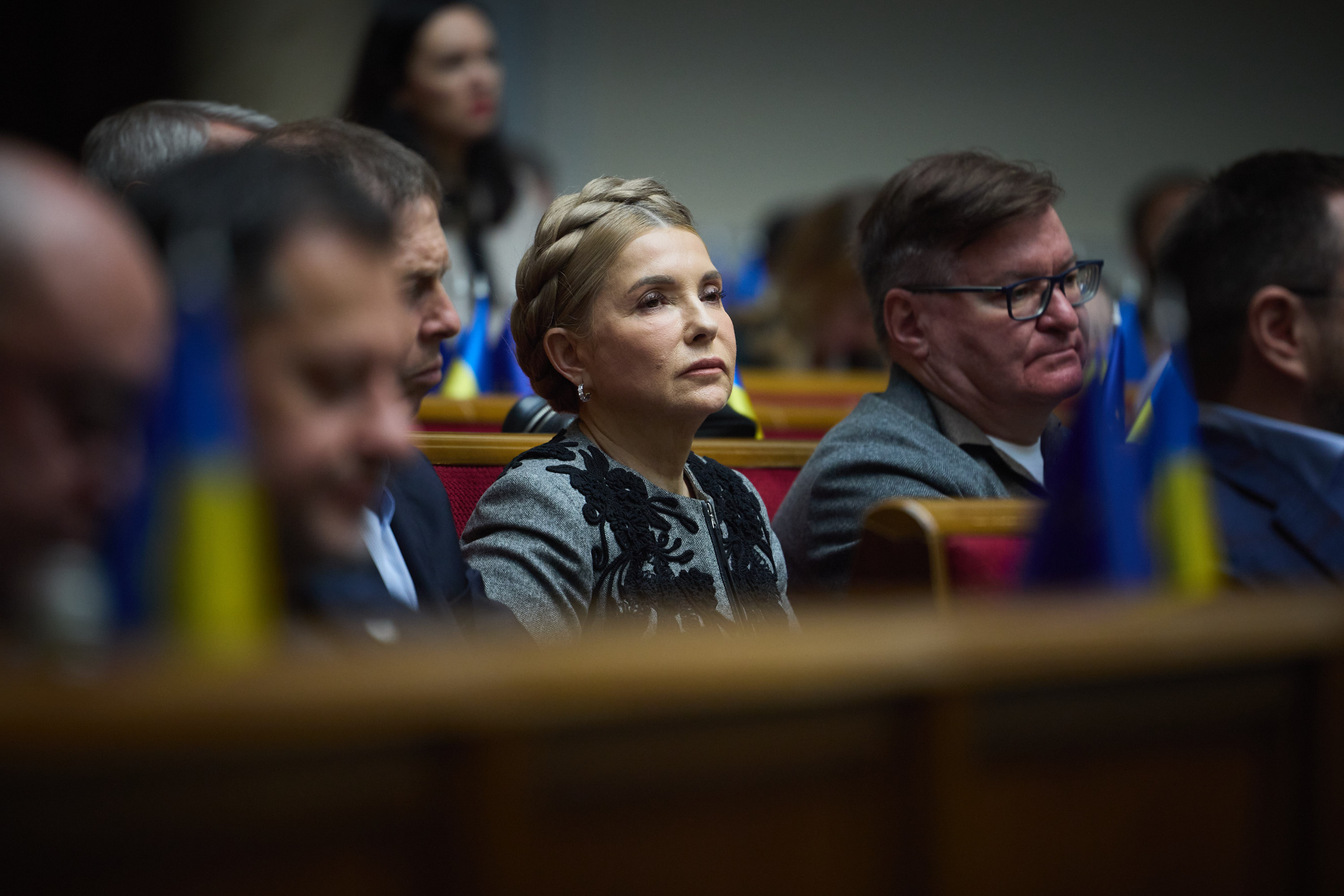
Tymoshenko attending Volodymyr Zelensky's address to the Verkhovna Rada in November 2024

In late February 2022, Yulia Tymoshenko urged NATO and the United Nations to protect Ukraine by closing its airspace and deploying peacekeeping forces to the country. She later stated that Putin aims to recreate the Soviet Union, posing a threat to Eastern Europe, and emphasized that Ukraine's NATO membership is crucial for its security. In early March, Tymoshenko took custody of the Okhmatdyt children's hospital, donating medicines and helping evacuate sick children from Kyiv. She also established the Center for Humanitarian Aid to assist vulnerable populations and the Ukrainian military.

Throughout 2022, Tymoshenko actively advocated for Ukraine's integration into the EU and NATO, participating in various international forums. She met with European leaders to discuss Ukraine's humanitarian situation and global food security and spoke out against peace negotiations with Russia without the full restoration of Ukraine's territorial integrity. Tymoshenko's international engagements included a call to rebuild the global security system and counter Russian disinformation.

In 2023, Tymoshenko continued her humanitarian efforts, raising funds for military hospitals and supporting wounded Ukrainian soldiers. She also took part in international conferences, advocating for Ukraine's needs and criticizing Russia's aggression. Her parliamentary activities included opposing legislation that would harm businesses and advocating for improved medical treatment and rehabilitation for soldiers.

In 2024, Tymoshenko faced increased pressure from Russia, being placed on its wanted list. Despite this, she continued her leadership in the Batkivshchyna party, marking its 25th anniversary by organizing humanitarian aid for the Ukrainian military. She also initiated a parliamentary investigation into corruption in Ukraine's energy sector and remained active in international diplomacy, addressing corruption and advocating for Ukraine's sovereignty.

On 19 June 2025, Yulia Tymoshenko headed the inter-factional association for the protection of the rights of veterans, combatants and their families.

On 19 August 2025, Yulia Tymoshenko took part in the Extraordinary EPP Summit, which was held with the participation of EU leaders who joined the negotiations in Washington.

On 27 August 2025, Tymoshenko registered in the Verkhovna Rada bill No 13704, which will allow wounded Ukrainian military personnel to receive qualified medical care, rehabilitation, and prosthetics.

Since September 2025, with the support of Yulia Tymoshenko, the Batkivshchyna party has launched a "hotline" to help veterans and military personnel.

On 18 November 2025, Yulia Tymoshenko announced the need for the resignation of the Cabinet of Ministers of Ukraine due to a corruption scandal in the energy sector of Ukraine.

On 26 November 2025, Yulia Tymoshenko participated in the summit of European Union leaders on the peace agreement.

On 4 December 2025, Yulia Tymoshenko headed the Temporary Investigative Commission to investigate violations of the rights of servicemen and veterans regarding treatment, rehabilitation and prosthetics.

On 17 December 2025, the Verkhovna Rada of Ukraine adopted Bill No. 14052, initiated by Yulia Tymoshenko, on improving the legal status of foreign military personnel.

On 17 December 2025, the National Academy of Sciences of Ukraine awarded Yulia Tymoshenko with an award for promoting the development of science.

On 18 December 2025, Yulia Tymoshenko called on the Ukrainian authorities to hold an all-Ukrainian referendum to determine the terms of the peace agreement.

On 30 April 2026, Tymoshenko participated in the International Democracy Union Forum in Zagreb, Croatia. During the event, Tymoshenko and Croatian Prime Minister Andrej Plenković discussed the achievements of peace in Ukraine and Ukraine's European perspective.

On 19 August 2026, the Verkhovna Rada of Ukraine adopted Bill No. 13704-d, initiated by Yulia Tymoshenko, which will provide free medical care, rehabilitation, and high-quality prosthetics for Ukrainian servicemen, veterans, and prisoners of war released from captivity.

=== 2026 anti-corruption investigation ===
In January 2026, Ukraine's National Anti-Corruption Bureau (NABU) and the Specialized Anti-Corruption Prosecutor's Office (SAPO) initiated a high-profile anti-corruption investigation involving Yulia Tymoshenko, who at the time served as a leading member of the Verkhovna Rada and head of the Batkivshchyna parliamentary faction. According to sources cited by Ukrainska Pravda, NABU and SAPO were conducting searches at the Kyiv offices of the Batkivshchyna party as part of their probe, and reportedly uncovered a scheme in which the faction leader allegedly offered improper benefits to members of other political factions in exchange for their votes on draft legislation. The preliminary classification of the alleged offense under Article 369.4 of the Criminal Code of Ukraine pertains to offering or giving an unlawful benefit.

On 16 January, Tymoshenko appeared in the High Anti-Corruption Court of Ukraine. She was barred from leaving Kyiv Oblast without NABU's approval and required to surrender international passports, and her bail was set at UAH 33 million. Tymoshenko denied the charges and said they were a political fabrication.

On 26 January the Appeals Chamber of the High Anti-Corruption Court (HACC) partially changed Tymoshenko's preventive measure. The court allowed the leader of the Batkivshchyna party to move freely around Ukraine and communicate with members of parliament.

During the court hearing, Yulia Tymoshenko released a report on an expert analysis conducted by the international digital media analytics platform PrismVote Analytics 2025. The experts analyzed the recordings provided by law enforcement agencies and concluded that they were not authentic. Yulia Tymoshenko claims that the NABU audio recordings featured in her case are the result of editing and post-production. The conclusions of the independent expert analysis indicate traces of third-party interference in the audio tracks.

On 4 February 2026, Yulia Tymoshenko filed a complaint with the High Council of Justice against the judge of the High Anti-Corruption Court of Ukraine, Vitaliy Dubas, for politically motivated decisions against her.

On 26 February 2026, the National Anti-Corruption Bureau of Ukraine implemented the decision of the Appellate Chamber of the High Anti-Corruption Court and returned to Yulia Tymoshenko the funds seized during the search.

On 15 April 2026, the High Anti-Corruption Court of Ukraine allowed Tymoshenko to travel abroad once to participate in an international event in Croatia.

On 21 April 2026, Tymoshenko stated that NABU conducted an examination against her using Russian software, which is expressly prohibited by the decree of the President of Ukraine.

On 22 April 2026, the Parliamentary Assembly of the Council of Europe adopted a written declaration expressing support for Yulia Tymoshenko in the NABU case. PACE member states expressed concern over violations of legal procedures during the investigation against Tymoshenko, noting in particular that searches of the Batkivshchyna office were conducted without a court order and that the audio recordings released by NABU had been edited. PACE called for Tymoshenko's lawyers to be granted access to the original audio file and the opportunity to conduct an independent examination of it.

7 May 2026, the High Anti-Corruption Court of Ukraine returned Tymoshenko's foreign passports. Tymoshenko herself stated in court that she does not plan to leave Ukraine. On Facebook, she wrote that the High Anti-Corruption Court is gradually lifting the restrictions in the case against her. "Today's lifting of the ban on traveling abroad for political activities is another such step," Tymoshenko wrote.

On 30 May 2026, the Kharkiv Human Rights Group published a conclusion on the case of the leader of the Batkivshchyna political party, Yulia Tymoshenko, in which it pointed out possible signs of politically motivated persecution and human rights violations during the investigation. The human rights activists analyzed the materials of the criminal proceedings and stated a number of violations by the anti-corruption authorities and the court. In particular, the report refers to the illegal conduct of secret investigative actions, searches without relevant court decisions, as well as restrictions on the right of the defense to access the key evidence in the case - the original audio recording for independent examination. In addition, the Kharkiv Human Rights Group emphasized the ignoring of the results of examinations that indicated possible interference with the audio recording, as well as the violation of the principle of presumption of innocence due to public statements by law enforcement officials regarding Tymoshenko. The conclusion also notes that the totality of these facts may indicate the political nature of the case and possible provocation. According to the standards of the European Court of Human Rights (ECHR), the investigation is obliged to demonstrate the absence of provocation of the crime on its part. Human rights activists announced that they will continue to monitor the proceedings and publicly inform about their progress.

On 5 June 2026, the European Parliament called on the Ukrainian authorities to stop political pressure on Yulia Tymoshenko and adhere to democratic standards.

On 18 June 2026, European Human Rights Lawyers appealed to the United Nations due to the political persecution of Yulia Tymoshenko by the NABU and the SAP.

On 7 July 2026, the High Anti-Corruption Court of Ukraine canceled the procedural obligations imposed on Yulia Tymoshenko.

On 13 July 2026, the Centrist Democrat International unanimously adopted the resolution "On the Protection of Ukraine's Sovereignty, Democracy and Political Pluralism", proposed by the Batkivshchyna party. The document states that the persecution of the leader of the opposition party "Batkivshchyna" Yulia Tymoshenko is incompatible with the principles of the rule of law and political pluralism and weakens the unity of Ukraine in the face of Russian aggression.

On 26 October 2026, HACC judge Oleh Tkachenko approved a motion by the defense, reducing Tymoshenko's bail 125-fold to 266,240 UAH due to her compliant procedural behavior. The court ordered the remaining 32.7 million UAH to be returned to the initial guarantors.

=== In absentia arrest in the Russian Federation ===
On 27 January 2026, the Prosecutor's Office of the Russian Federation announced the arrest in absentia of Yulia Tymoshenko in reference to military “fakes.” According to the investigation, Tymoshenko, motivated by political and “ideological hatred and hostility” towards Russian military personnel, allegedly prepared and posted on her social media page a publication containing “deliberately false information about the Russian army's involvement in the killings of civilians” in Bucha and Irpin.

== Political views ==
=== Foreign policy ===
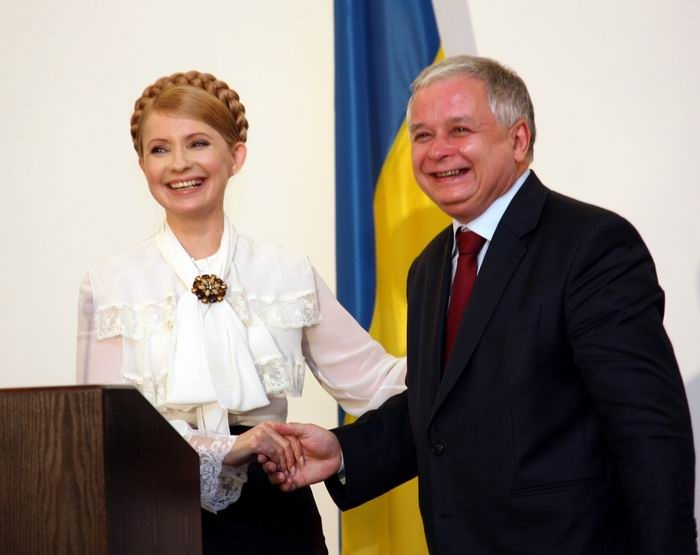
Tymoshenko meeting Polish president Lech Kaczyński in 2008

Tymoshenko wants her country to become a member state of the EU, while also expressing concern about antagonizing Russia, saying: "I try to defend our interests so that we can find a balance in our relations both with the EU and Russia." Tymoshenko supports Ukraine joining NATO, stating it would be "uncomfortable" for Ukraine to remain "in a void, outside all existing security systems". According to Tymoshenko, the question of Ukraine joining any system of collective security would "be resolved only by referendum". Tymoshenko favours close relations with the EU, including the creation of a free trade area between Ukraine and the EU and later a full EU membership. According to Tymoshenko, "The European project has not been completed as yet. It has not been completed because there is no full-fledged participation of Ukraine." She opposes foreign intervention in internal Ukrainian affairs: "Ukraine's realization of its sovereign rights, forming a modern political nation, cannot be considered as a policy aimed against anyone." In 2010, Tymoshenko did not want to expand the lease contract of the Russian Black Sea fleet in Ukraine, saying: "The Constitution of Ukraine quite clearly stipulates that foreign military bases cannot be deployed in Ukraine, and this constitutional clause is the fundamental basis of the state's security." She also believes in "building a genuine civil society" as the best way to help democracy.

Tymoshenko wrote an article called "Containing Russia" that was published in the May–June 2007 edition of the journal Foreign Affairs. In the article she criticized Russian expansionism. Consequently, the article irked Russia and more than a week after the article was published, Russia responded by calling it an "anti-Russian manifesto" and "an attempt to once again draw dividing lines in Europe." (Note: It was subsequently revealed that significant portions of the article were paraphrased from an article written by former U.S. Secretary of State Henry Kissinger. Tymoshenko's staff denied allegations of plagiarism on the grounds that the Foreign Affairs format does not usually include attributions. Russian Foreign Minister Sergei Lavrov wrote an article called "Containing Russia: Back To The Future?" for the same journal which was apparently meant to be a response to Tymoshenko. He withdrew the article before publication, accusing the editors of changing his text and said his article was subjected to "censorship".)

On 21 May 2016, Tymoshenko expressed hope that the EU will provide Ukraine a visa-free regime. Tymoshenko stressed that the Ukrainian state is there to protect the world all over Europe, continuing to fight the Russian aggression.

=== Internal affairs ===
==== Identity politics ====
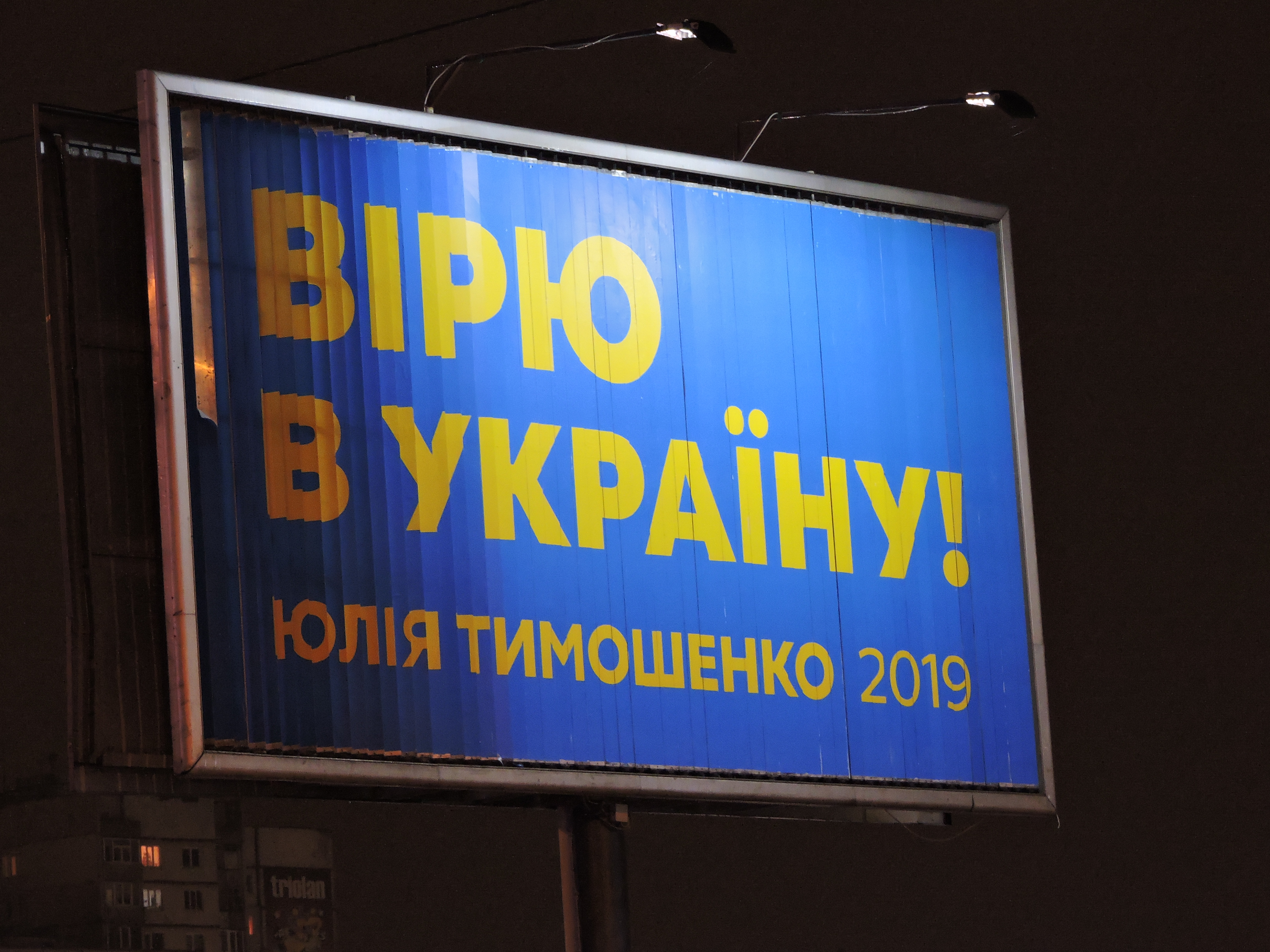
"(I) Believe in Ukraine" - a billboard in support of Yulia Tymoshenko during the 2019 presidential campaign

Tymoshenko regards Ukraine as a "unitary and indivisible state". Tymoshenko considers separatist attitudes in Ukraine unacceptable: "Love one another, from Donetsk, Crimea, Luhansk, Dnipropetrovsk, Kharkiv, Lviv, Ternopil, Ivano-Frankivsk, Kyiv and all the other corners of our native land." According to Tymoshenko, citizens in Russian-speaking Dnipropetrovsk already understood Ukrainian in Soviet times and that problems surrounding the Russian language in Ukraine were "exaggerated and don't exist". Tymoshenko opposes the introduction of Russian as a second official state language. On 7 April 2014, she stated she supported the 2012 language law which is aimed at giving Russian and other minority languages (if in a region the percentage of a national minority exceeded 10%) the status of regional language. About her own attitude toward the Ukrainian language, Tymoshenko has stated that "today I am thinking in Ukrainian... and the fact that I know Russian very well, I think it is not a secret for you... you all know that I was brought up in the Russian speaking region in Dnipropetrovsk, to my mind, I spared no effort to speak Ukrainian as soon as possible as I came in the Government."

==== Economy and finance ====
The first Tymoshenko Government was in favor of transparent and honest re-privatization of 3,000 enterprises, as with the case of the Kryvorizhstal steel mill. Tymoshenko believes that Ukraine's economy is excessively monopolized. Tymoshenko is against privatization of the gas transportation system in Ukraine. Tymoshenko lists the salvation of the economy of Ukraine during the 2008–2009 Ukrainian financial crisis as one of her achievements. The second Tymoshenko Government has spent 1.6 billion hryvnya on modernizing the coal mining industry.

Tymoshenko wants to raise the general level of social standards by equalizing salaries in the industrial and social spheres, and pledged in November 2009 to revamp Ukraine's hospitals and health system within two years. She also pledged tax breaks for farmers. Other economic policies included compensation for depositors who lost Soviet-era savings, price controls on food and medicines to bring inflation down, and calls for a review of murky privatizations and high social spending. Tymoshenko wants to cut the number of taxes by a third to simplify the system, and wants to cut the Value Added Tax (VAT) and offer tax breaks to importers of new technologies to poor regions to boost investment there. In December 2009, the second Tymoshenko Government proposed creating independent anti-corruption bureaus in Ukraine.

==== Energy security ====
Tymoshenko believes Ukraine can gain energy security and independence, and she wants to speed up exploration and extraction of oil and natural gas from the Black Sea shelf. Considering nuclear power provides almost 50% of the electricity supply in Ukraine, Tymoshenko's government agreed to cooperate with the company Westin to establish factory production of nuclear fuel in Ukraine, independent of Russia. She also suggested a 10-year tax break for enterprises that would develop alternative energy sources in Ukraine.

==== Law and constitution ====
Tymoshenko is for the cancellation of Verkhovna Rada deputies' immunity from prosecution. For Ukraine, Tymoshenko prefers the proportional representation voting system with open lists. Tymoshenko wants to reform the forming of state executive bodies, and favours giving parliamentary opposition "real instruments of influence on the authorities". She also wants Ukrainian court system reforms and wants devolution of executive power to local authorities. Together with representatives of regional governments, Tymoshenko expanded a Law that aimed to empower local authorities. In the summer of 2009, she claimed she tried to bring together different political parties in order to amend the constitution and switch to a parliamentary form of government. In February 2011, Tymoshenko stated "Viktor Yanukovych's naked attempt to hijack the election that precipitated the Orange Revolution should have resulted in him being banned from running in future elections."

In November 2009, Tymoshenko called Ukraine "an absolutely ungovernable country" due to the changes to the Constitution of Ukraine as a part of a political compromise between the acting authorities (former-President Kuchma) and opposition during the Orange Revolution. Tymoshenko has characterised those reforms as "incomplete", and the Yulia Tymoshenko Bloc voted against them in December 2004. In January 2010, Tymoshenko called for urgent amendments to the Constitution via the majority of the Verkhovna Rada after a survey or plebiscite is conducted. In April 2011, she still believed the constitution "didn't work".

== Electoral history ==
=== Presidential elections ===
Election	Party	First round result			Second round result		
Election	Party	Votes	%	Result	Votes	%	Result
2010	Fatherland	6,159,810	25.05%	Second	11,593,357	45.47%	Lost
2014	Fatherland	2,310,050	12.81%	Second	—N/a	—N/a	—N/a
2019	Fatherland	2,532,452	13.40%	Third	—N/a	—N/a	—N/a

=== Parliamentary elections ===
Election	Constituency	Party	Result
1994	Electoral district No.229, Bobrynets	Independent	Elected (by-election in April 1996)
1998	Electoral district No.99, Kirovohrad Oblast	Hromada	Elected
2002	Party list	Yulia Tymoshenko Bloc, No.1	Elected
2006	Party list	Yulia Tymoshenko Bloc, No.1	Elected
2007	Party list	Yulia Tymoshenko Bloc, No.1	Elected
2014	Party list	Fatherland, No.2	Elected
2019	Party list	Fatherland, No.1	Elected

== Family and personal life ==
Yulia Tymoshenko's mother, Lyudmila Mykolayivna Telehina (born Nelepova), was born on 11 August 1937 in Dnipropetrovsk. Her father, Volodymyr Abramovych Hrihyan, was born on 3 December 1937, also in Dnipropetrovsk. His Soviet passport gave his nationality as Latvian. His mother was Maria Yosypivna Hrihyan, born in 1909.

Ukrainian media have published speculation regarding the genealogy of Tymoshenko. Some of the hypotheses have no scientific evidence (for example, the hypothesis of the Armenian origin of the surname "Grigyan"); or could be designed to create negative publicity, although her Minister of Communications had in 2005 described her origins as half-Jewish, half-Armenian.

Yulia's paternal grandfather, Abram Kapitelman (Ukrainian: Абрам Кельманович Капітельман), was born in 1914. After graduating from Dnipropetrovsk State University in 1940, Kapitelman was sent to work in Western Ukraine, where he worked "one academic quarter" as the director of a public Jewish school in the city Sniatyn. Kapitelman was mobilized into the army in the autumn of 1940 and subsequently was killed while taking part in the Great Patriotic War (1941–1945) on 8 November 1944, with the rank of lieutenant in Signal corps.

About her ethnicity, Yulia Tymoshenko herself has said: "On my father's side – everyone is Latvian for ten generations, and on my mother's side – everyone is Ukrainian for ten generations." Tymoshenko's parents were both born in Ukraine and are, therefore, Ukrainian as defined by the Law on Citizenship of Ukraine and by the Ukrainian Constitution.

Tymoshenko has said that, like most Soviet citizens, she spoke only Russian in her childhood (although she studied the Ukrainian language and literature at school for ten years, as did all schoolchildren in Soviet Ukraine). In January 2010, Tymoshenko stated that in Dnipropetrovsk she did not have to speak Ukrainian until she was 36 (i.e. before 1996). According to Tymoshenko, her braids are a family tradition.

In 1979, Yulia married businessman Oleksandr Tymoshenko (born 11 June 1960). The couple have a daughter – Yevhenia (Eugenia) Tymoshenko (born 20 February 1980) – a graduate of the London School of Economics (Bsc "Government", Msc "Russian and Post-Soviet Studies").

=== Personal life ===
Tymoshenko and her husband rent a house in Kyiv and own an apartment in Dnipro. Houses in Dnipro belong to their relatives. Tymoshenko has declared she never used and will never use or move into a state-owned summer house, in contrast with all former-Presidents and many high-ranking officials of Ukraine, who live in state-owned dachas in Koncha-Zaspa. According to Ukrainian media, Tymoshenko lives in an estate in Koncha-Zaspa, "rented from a friend". In March 2014, Tymoshenko opened the door of her house to public activists and guided them around.

In her spare time, before she was imprisoned, Tymoshenko ran on a treadmill for exercise and listened to the music of Andrea Bocelli, Sarah Brightman, Anna Netrebko and Alessandro Safina. Ukrainska Pravda and Left Bank are her favourite news sources. Tymoshenko stated that she watched the Tunisian Revolution and Egyptian Revolution of 2011 "with joy and admiration".

On 23 August 2020, Tymoshenko tested positive for COVID-19 and was hospitalized in serious condition, with one of her spokespeople saying that "her condition is assessed as serious, her temperature is up to 39 [Celsius (102 °F)]". On 25 August, Tymoshenko was moved to the intensive care unit after her health worsened and prompted a transfer, a spokeswoman said, adding that she remains in "serious condition." On 2 September, Tymoshenko announced through her Facebook account that "Finally today, my crisis condition is behind. And although recovery is still a distant prospect, now there is an opportunity to return to normal life, step by step," adding "that fighting off a serious disease for almost two weeks alters the perception of reality". On 11 September Tymoshenko's press secretary Maryna Soroka announced that Tymoshenko had tested negative for COVID-19.

== Cultural and political image ==
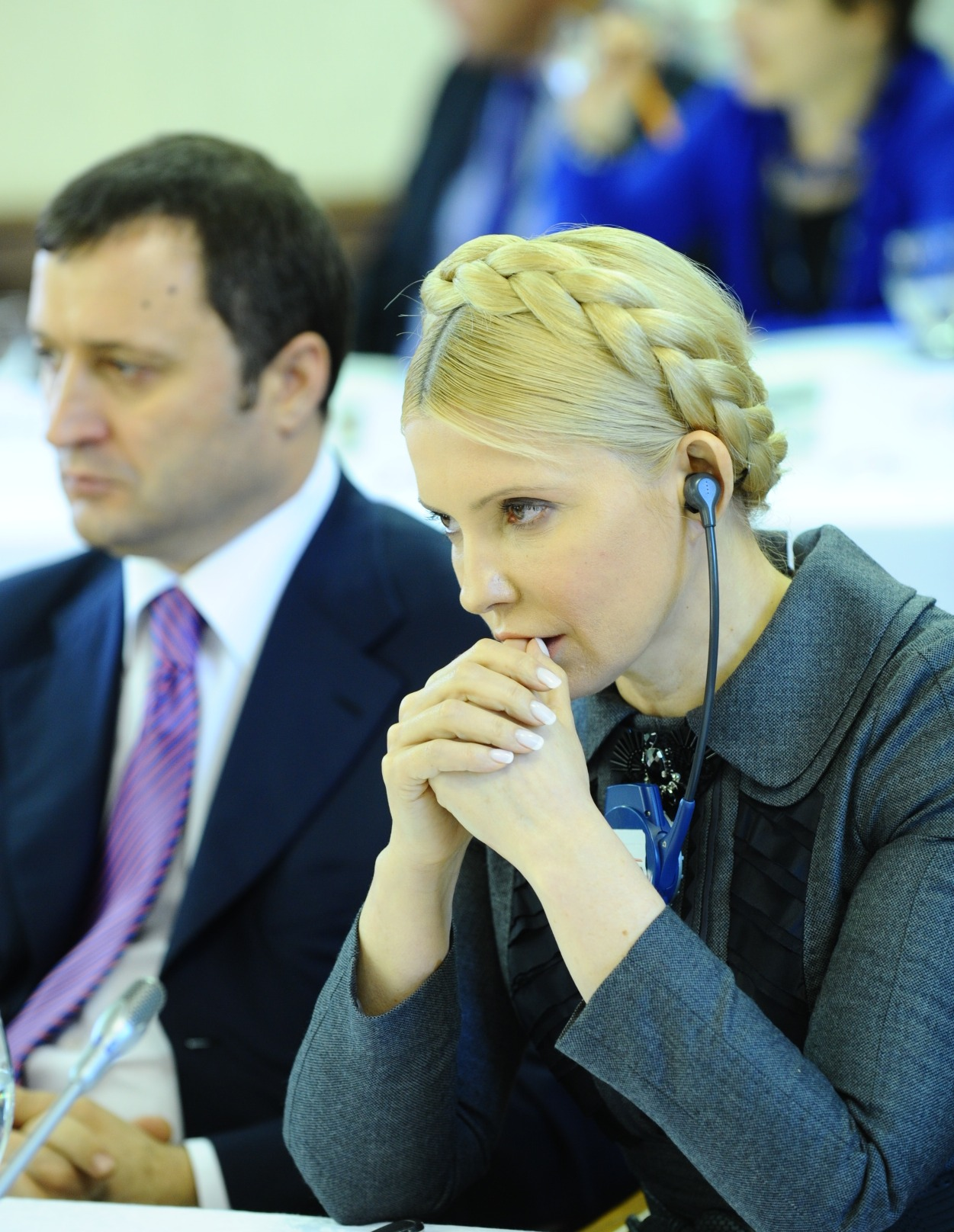
Tymoshenko wearing her trademark hairstyle at the 2011 European People's Party summit

Tymoshenko is a voluble public performer. Her fiery rhetoric made her an icon of the Orange Revolution. Tymoshenko's visual image, especially her trademark hairstyle, has been claimed by one of her political consultants to be inspired by the figure of Ukrainian poetess and political activist Lesya Ukrainka. While interpreted by some as a sign of emancipation, Tymoshenko's emphasis on her outward looks as an instrument of gaining support has led some critics to accuse her of sexualization of politics.

Tymoshenko's critics have claimed her to be an oligarch and accused her of acquiring her funds in an improper way. These accusations were backed by her ties to Ukrainian prime minister and convicted criminal Pavlo Lazarenko. However, prosecutors in Lazarenko's case have dismissed any connection between his illegal operations and Tymoshenko. Despite this, discrepancies between Tymoshenko's officially declared income and her actual lifestyle have been noted by the Ukrainian press.

Several prominent Ukrainian politicians, including former president Viktor Yushchenko, have accused Tymoshenko of populism, authoritarian tendencies and working in the interest of Russia. On the other hand, Tymoshenko has been praised as a patriot and promoter of Ukraine's sovereignty by foreign leaders such as Vladimir Putin and Javier Solana, and was described as an "effective politician" and "extravagant woman" by some of her political opponents from the pro-Russian Party of Regions.

In 2005 Tymoshenko was ranked by Forbes as the world's third most powerful woman, behind Condoleezza Rice and Wu Yi. According to the Ukrainian magazine Focus, Tymoshenko placed first in an annual ranking of the most influential women in Ukraine in 2006–2010. In December 2011, Tymoshenko's party BYuT-Batkivschyna nominated her for the Nobel Peace Prize. In 2012 a national rating by the Razumkov Center and the "Foundation for Democratic Initiatives" recognized Yulia Tymoshenko to be the best prime minister in the history of Ukraine.

According to the sociological group "Rating" Yulia Tymoshenko was ranked as third most trusted politician in early April 2021, behind President Volodymyr Zelenskyy and then-Chairman of the Verkhovna Rada Dmytro Razumkov. However, since 2022, Tymoshenko's trust ratings have declined sharply, and in May 2025, a KIIS poll showed Tymoshenko had the second-highest net distrust rating among Ukrainian politicians, second only to Oleksii Arestovych. A July 2025 survey by "Rating" ranked her as public figure with the highest net distrust.

Tymoshenko's figure has inspired several documentary films and plays, as well as a book dedicated to her role in Ukrainian politics and fight against Russian influence.

== Honours ==
=== Nominations ===
In December 2011, Tymoshenko's party BYuT-Batkivschyna nominated her for the Nobel Peace Prize.

=== Awards ===
- Order of Saint Varvara, Great Martyr from Ukrainian Orthodox Church of Moscow Patriarchate (1998)
- Third-most powerful woman in the world, rating by Forbes magazine (July 2005)
- "Person of the year in Central and Eastern Europe" award at International Economic Forum in Krynica-Zdrój, Poland (September 2005)
- "Prix de la fondation Crans Montana" award for efficient governance and anti-corruption campaign at the annual session of the Crans Montana Forum (December 2005) (Note: Tymoshenko's daughter Yevhenia Tymoshenko received a medal for her contribution to the defense of democracy and human rights from the same organization in October 2012.)
- "For Political Courage" by French magazine "Politique internationale"; it was the first award given to a Ukrainian nominee over the last 25 years of the magazine's history (March 2007)
- Award by American NGO Conservative Political Action Conference for contribution to democracy development. (March 2007)
- "Shakhtarska Slava" award on Coalminer Day in Luhansk (2008)
- The Order of the Holy Sepulchre award from the Jerusalem Orthodox Church, given to Tymoshenko by Patriarch Theophilos III of Jerusalem (October 2008)
- The Saint Andrew the First-Called Order of II degree (the highest church award of the Ukrainian Orthodox Church of the Kyivan Patriarchate) from Apostolic Patriarch of Ukraine Philaret (2011)
- The Pope Boniface VIII International Award (October 2012). (The first person to receive the award was Pope John Paul II.)
- Manuel Carrasco Formiguera medal for her contribution to the defense of democracy and freedom and the struggle for the restoration of the rule of law in Ukraine, awarded by the Democratic Union of Catalonia party (July 2013).
- On 18 October 2014, in Khmelnytskyi, journalists presented Yulia Tymoshenko with the Yakov Halchevsky Prize "For significant contribution to the development of democracy and asceticism in state-building in Ukraine." The Batkivshchyna leader was awarded this prize in 2011. The diploma was presented to Yulia Tymoshenko in the Pechersk court, and the award was presented to Yakov Galchevsky's book "Against the Red Occupiers" by journalists in 2014.
- In March 2023, Yulia Tymoshenko received the Bush-Thatcher Award for Freedom and Democracy.
- In December 2025, the National Academy of Sciences of Ukraine awarded Yulia Tymoshenko with an award for promoting the development of science.

== Cited sources ==
- "Profile: Yulia Tymoshenko". BBC News. 4 March 2010.
- Jeffries, Ian (2004). The countries of the former Soviet Union at the turn of the twenty-first century: the Baltic and European states in transition. ISBN 978-0-415-25230-0.

Political offices
Preceded by Mykola Azarov; Acting	Prime Minister of Ukraine; 2005	Succeeded by Yuriy Yekhanurov
Preceded by Viktor Yanukovych	Prime Minister of Ukraine; 2007–2010	Succeeded by Oleksandr Turchynov; Acting
