= Criminal cases against Yulia Tymoshenko since 2010 =

Ukrainian legal cases since 2010

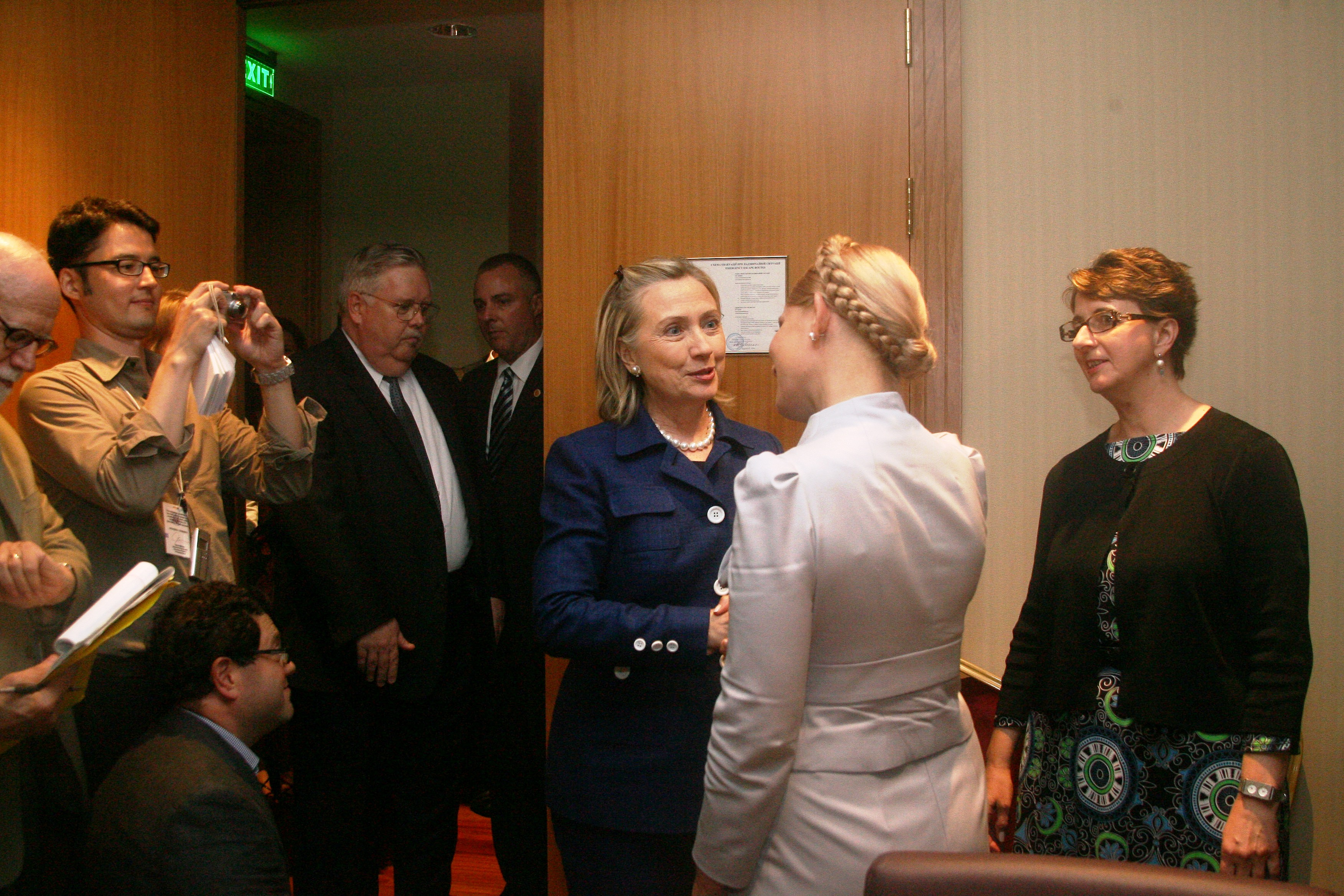
Meeting Tymoshenko and U.S. Secretary of State Hillary Clinton (Kyiv), 2.6.2010)

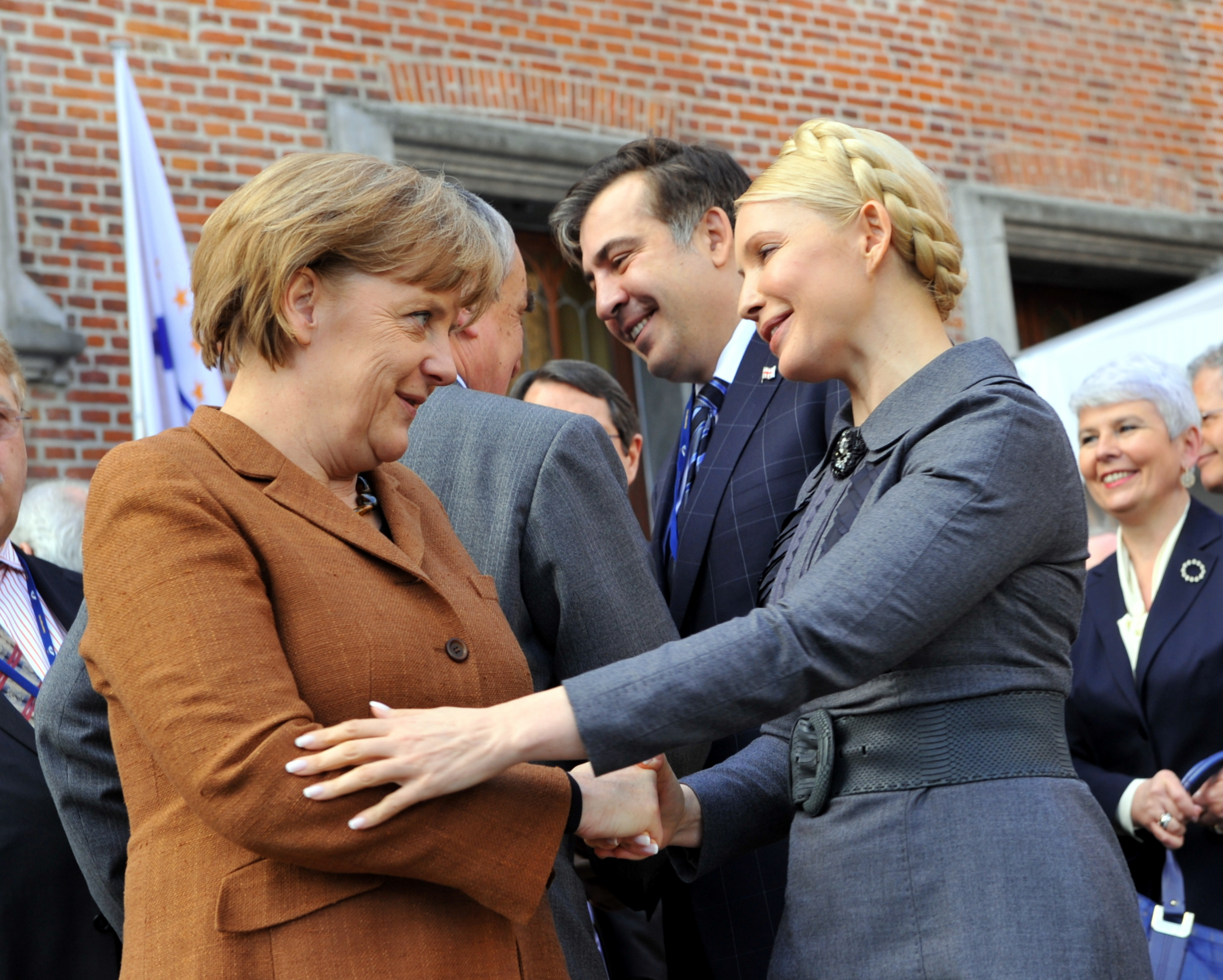
Tymoshenko and Chancellor Angela Merkel at a March 2011 European People's Party summit in Brussels (7 March 2011)

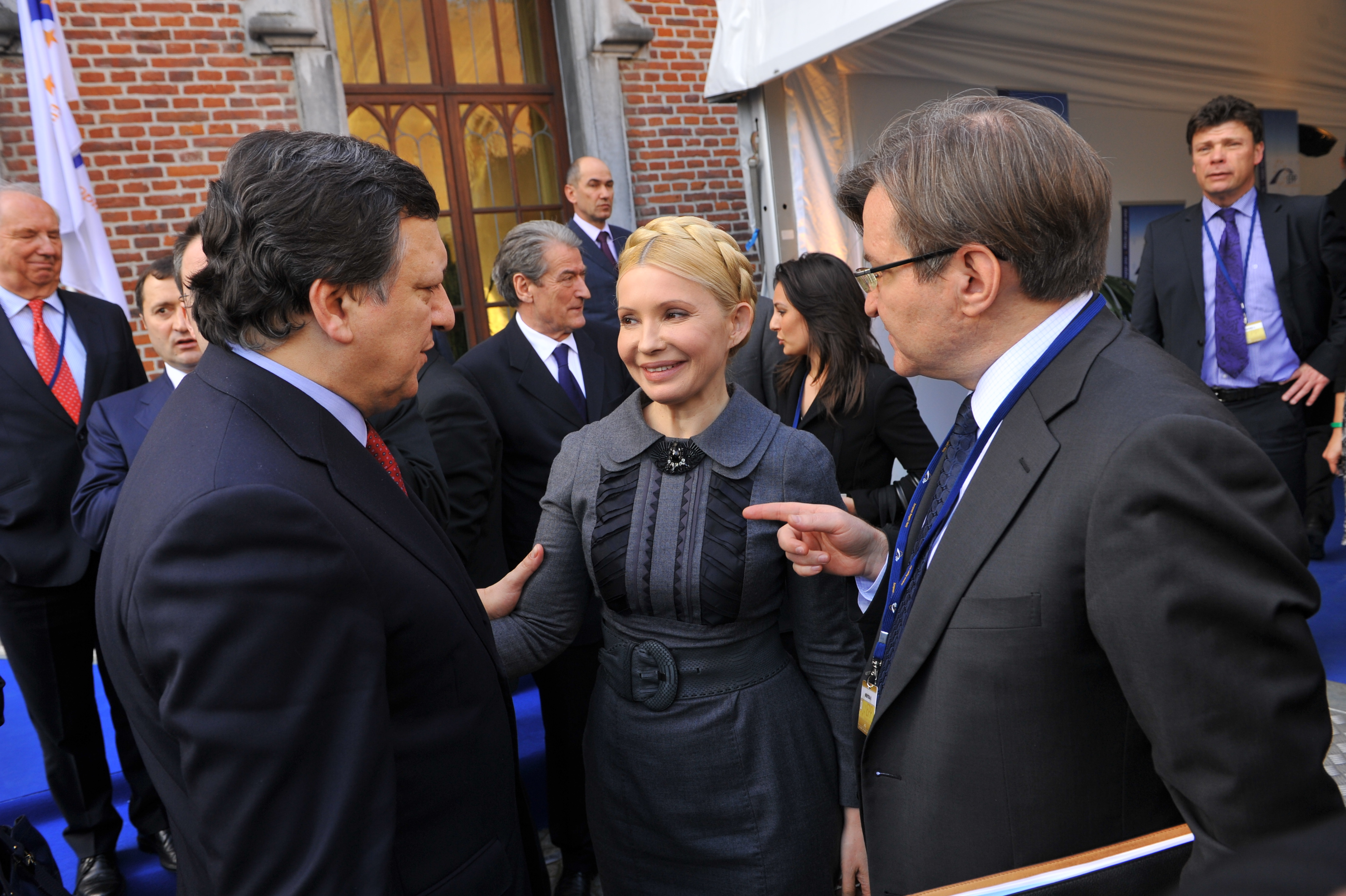
Tymoshenko and President of the European Commission José Manuel Barroso at a March 2011 European People's Party summit in Brussels; General Prosecutor of Ukraine’s Office lifted the travel ban imposed on Tymoshenko after being officially invited to this event by U.S. Senator John McCain and European People’s Party President Wilfried Martens

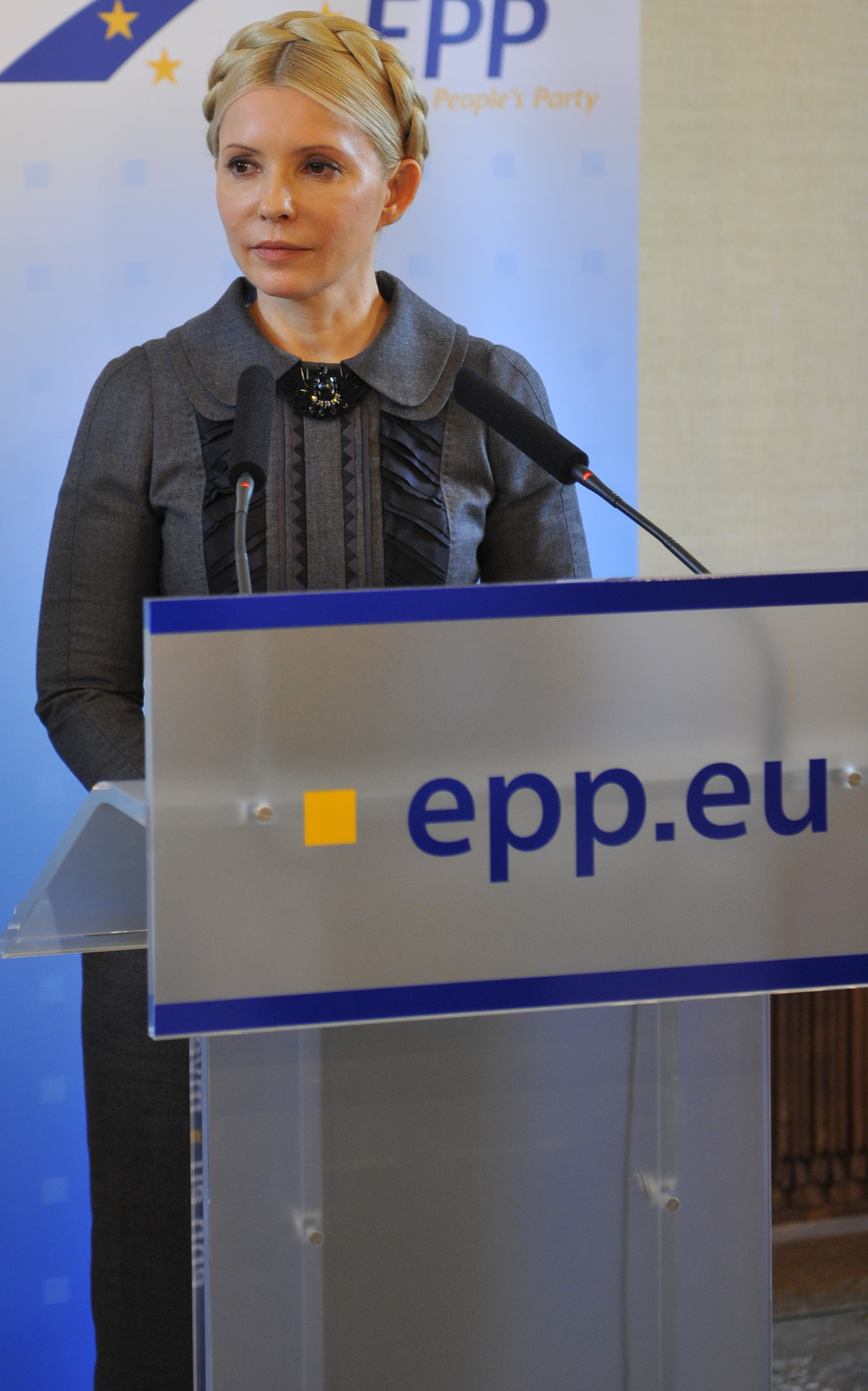
Yulia Tymoshenko in March 2011

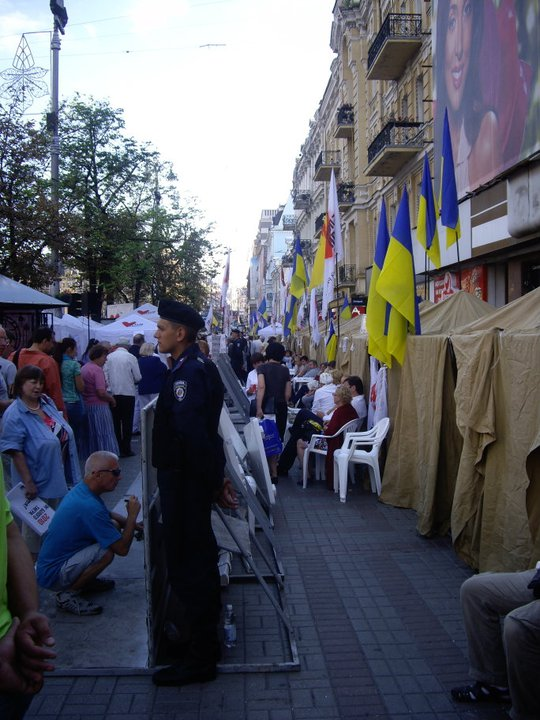
Protesters near the Pechersk district court during the criminal case. On her 51st birthday (27 November 2011) an action called "Flowers for Yulia" happened in front of the Lukyanivska Prison where she was held at that time.

Since May 2010, a series of criminal cases have been opened against Ukrainian politician and former Prime Minister of Ukraine Yulia Tymoshenko. After Tymoshenko was released from prison on February 22, 2014, in the concluding days of the Euromaidan revolution, following a revision of the Criminal Code of Ukraine that effectively decriminalized the actions for which she was imprisoned, she was cleared of all charges. She was officially rehabilitated on February 28, 2014. Just after the Euromaidan revolution, the Ukrainian Supreme Court closed the case and found that "no crime was committed".

By November 2011 Tymoshenko was under criminal investigation for ten criminal acts; Ukrainian prosecutors have claimed she has committed more criminal acts. The cases are:

- intent to bribe Supreme Court judges in 2003,
- misuse of public finances in 2009 — criminal cases involving "ambulances for rural medicine" and "Kyoto money" (funds that Ukraine received for selling their quotas under the Kyoto Protocol),
- abuse of office over a natural gas imports contract signed with Russia in January 2009,
- criminal case on "United Energy Systems of Ukraine" (UESU) (1996–1997) is constantly reopened (in 2001, 2011) and closed (in 2001, 2003, 2005). Was reopened in Ukraine on 24 October 2011 (non-delivery by UESU of goods to Russia for $405.5 million in 1996–1997, 4 cases of tax evasion by UESU in 1996–1997),
- involvement in the 1996 murder of oligarch Yevhen Shcherban in Donetsk.

In addition Tymoshenko's lawyer Serhiy Vlasenko stood accused of car theft, robbery and failing to obey a court ruling stemming from his divorce.

On 11 October 2011, a Ukrainian court sentenced Tymoshenko to seven years in prison after she was found guilty of abusing her office when brokering the 2009 gas deal with Russia. From 5 August 2011 until her release, Tymoshenko was held in custody. At first she was held in Kyiv, before being imprisoned in Kharkiv on December 30, 2011. From May 2012 until the date of her release, she was hospitalized and received treatment for a spinal disc herniation. Tymoshenko went on three hunger strikes during her imprisonment.

Representatives of several countries and human rights organizations have rated the trials against Tymoshenko as "selective justice" and "political persecution". The European Union shelved the European Union Association Agreement and Deep and Comprehensive Free Trade Agreement with Ukraine, and EU leaders suggested that these agreements would not be ratified unless Ukraine addressed concerns over a "stark deterioration of democracy and the rule of law", including the imprisonment of Tymoshenko and Yuriy Lutsenko in 2011 and 2012.

Tymoshenko and her supporters saw the trials (and other similar trials) as political payback by Ukrainian president Viktor Yanukovych and his Party of Regions. Both have denied this. According to President Yanukovych the cases were non-partisan measures to combat corruption in Ukraine. He also hinted in late February 2012 that he could pardon Tymoshenko if she would apply for it, but this option was brushed aside by Tymoshenko.

In 2026, Tymoshenko was investigated by the National Anti-Corruption Bureau of Ukraine (NABU) on allegations of bribing lawmakers. She denied the charges and was released on bail.

== "Сrackdown of opposition" in Ukraine ==
=== The point of view of the EU, the U.S., Russia ===
The European Union (EU) and EU member states, along with the United States, Russia and Canada (as well as Amnesty International and Human Rights Watch) expressed concern that the allegations against Tymoshenko did not constitute crimes and that the charges were politically motivated. The United Kingdom and the United States have stated that this phrasing also applies to the prosecution of dozens other former ministers and officials, including former Ukrainian minister Bohdan Danylyshyn, who was granted political asylum in the Czech Republic in January 2011 "because his prosecution may be politically motivated".

In 2012–2013, government and non-governmental organizations in Europe and the United States more clearly indicated the presence of political prisoners in Ukraine. On May 23, 2012, the European Parliament issued a resolution that, for the first time, explicitly referenced "political prisoners in Ukraine". Tymoshenko and her colleagues were described as "political prisoners" in the report, which was adopted at the June session of the PACE (2013) :

- "4.1.6. Conclusion: Yulia Tymoshenko as a presumed political prisoner under Assembly Resolution 1900 (2012).

71. The analysis of key issues as presented above, in light of the criteria for the definition of political prisoners in Resolution 1900 (2012), leads to a fairly compelling result, namely that Ms Tymoshenko must be recognised as a presumed political prisoner:
1) Ms Tymoshenko is a key opposition leader and main rival of the current President. She was sentenced to a particularly harsh seven-year prison term on the basis of vague abuse-of-office charges.
2) These charges effectively criminalised the political decision she had taken as Prime Minister in favour of an agreement with Russia to end an acute crisis threatening the provision of gas to Ukraine and other European countries.
3) The prosecution and trial were marred by numerous presumptive procedural violations.
4) Ms Tymoshenko was also put under intense physical and psychological pressure, both during pretrial detention and in post-conviction custody. Her family, lawyers and political allies, in particular Mr Vlasenko, have also suffered from a co-ordinated campaign of harassment and persecution by the authorities.
5) The legally and factually dubious nature of the new charges brought against her further underpins their political motivation"

=== Yanukovych's point of view ===
Ukrainian president Viktor Yanukovych and the Party of Regions came to power in February 2010 following the Ukrainian presidential elections of 2010, where Tymoshenko lost to Yanukovych after gaining 45.5% of the votes in the second and final round.). Yanukovych and his allies have been accused of trying to create a "controlled democracy" in Ukraine, and of trying to "destroy" the main opposition party BYuT (BYuT was dissolved in December 2012, but the core party of the alliance "Fatherland" remained a major force in Ukrainian politics (Tymoshenko was the leader of this party)). Both have denied these charges. Criminal cases were opened, in the spring of 2010, against a dozen former officials from the second Tymoshenko Government, who were also given prison terms). Some observers speculated that these trials were part of what they described as President Viktor Yanukovych’s crackdown on his political opponents. Other former top officials who served with this cabinet and other members of Tymoshenko's "Fatherland" (party) were also arrested on "abuse of power" charges in the period following February 2010. The opposition against Yanukovych again dismissed these arrests as "political persecution". Yanukovych has stated these arrests should be seen as only "a serious battle against corruption". In a press conference on 12 May 2010, President Yanukovych's representative in the Verkhovna Rada, Yury Miroshnychenko, stated that Yanukovych was against political repression for criticism of the regime. President According to Yanukovych (on 4 February 2011) "many lies told and attempts made to misinform the international community and ordinary people in Ukraine about the true state of affairs in the country". He also stated that "a crushing blow delivered under his rule to corruption and bureaucracy has been met with resistance". In February 2012, however, Yanukovych stated that the trial of Tymoshenko and other former officials "didn't meet European standards and principles".

Tymoshenko herself filed lawsuit in courts outside Ukraine, demanding that Prime Minister Mykola Azarov be banned from making statements about her alleged involvement in the crimes of former prime minister Pavlo Lazarenko.

== Criminal cases against Tymoshenko prior to 2010 ==
Criminal cases against Yulia Tymoshenko were initiated:

- In 2001 (before the parliamentary elections of 2002): in January in Ukraine; in August, 2001 – in Russia.
- In 2004 ( before the presidential elections of 2004): in May in Ukraine; in September (15.09.2004) — in Russia.

Those cases were opened concerning United Energy Systems of Ukraine (UESU) activity in 1996–1997 years. In Ukraine, the UESU cases were closed at the beginning of 2005 (for lack of evidence); in Russia - in December 2005 (as a result of expiry of the period of limitation).

== Cases since 2010 ==
Certain analysts and Ukrainian politicians have pointed out that they believe that some Ukrainian business tycoons with "lucrative relations" with Russia are deliberately hindering Ukraine's European Union integration and are using Tymoshenko's trial as a tool in these attempts. Tymoshenko is a former owner of United Energy Systems of Ukraine.

=== Reopening of the case of intent to bribe the judges of the Supreme Court in 2003 ===
In June 2004 (it was the beginning of the presidential elections in Ukraine) Tymoshenko was accused that she was going to bribe the judges of the Supreme Court in 2003 (exactly "was going to bribe", because there was no attempt to "transfer bribes") with the aim to release from jail her father-in-law Hennady Tymoshenko and Antonina Bolyura (both worked for United Energy Systems of Ukraine).

The essence of the criminal case: in June 2004, Ukrainian TV showed a video material — Yu. Tymoshenko (and her bodyguard) were shown in the office of some lawyer (it was he who made the recording) who had promised to procure in re-hearing Tymoshenko's father-in-law's lawsuit. Tymoshenko hurried up the lawyer and was disturbed with his resultless efforts despite money given to him. It is important to emphasize that Hennadi Tymoshenko in prison suffered a microinsult. Just based on that video recording, a criminal suit was initiated against Tymoshenko under the articles 15 part 2 and 369 part 1 of the Criminal Code of Ukraine. But this criminal case was closed in 2004, under Kuchma presidency.

A 2004 criminal case against Tymoshenko on accusations she had planned to bribe Supreme Court judges in 2003 — was reopened 12 May 2010. However, on this criminal case no message almost since its opening in 2010. This criminal case fell apart again.

It should also be said that Hennady Tymoshenko died May 24, 2012, aged 75 years. Yulia Tymoshenko at the time was in prison, she was not given permission to attend the funeral of the man, whom she called "father".

=== Criminal cases involving "Kyoto money" and "ambulances for rural medicine" ===
==== Joint auditing by Minfin of Ukraine and the US firm Trout Cacheris ====
On 5 May 2010 Azarov's Cabinet of Ministers made a decision to attract the firm Trout Cacheris PLLC (Washington) to audit Tymoshenko's office activities in 2007–2010 years (two more firms, Akim Gump and an Investigation Agency Kroll Inc., were hired as subcontractors). More than 10 mln US dollars were planned to pay for auditing.

On 15 October 2010 (after abolition of the Ukrainian Constitution on October, the 1st and before the beginning of the regional elections on October, the 31st), Azarov government (namely, Auditing Department of Financial Ministry) completed auditing Tymoshenko's second government activities. The two US firms were involved in auditing – Trout Cacheris PLLC and Akim Gump (it could be seen indicative that the US Embassy in Ukraine set themselves apart from those firms). Upon completion of the auditing, the Auditing Department of the Ukrainian Ministry of Finance declared 43 bln grn (that is $5 billion) "misuse" of state money. However, а month later this amount was 15 times reduced and the money appeared not to be "stolen" but transferred to the Ukrainian Pension Fund. Actually, it was the money (320 mln euros) received from selling to Japan a "greenhouse gas emanation quota". Such a transaction was quite a new for Ukraine, and Tymoshenko government were proud to implement it, the more so that it was done at the time of the "world global crisis 2008-2009".

Tymoshenko was charged with, principally, two violations, on which basis the two criminal cases were opened:

1) On 2 December 2010 Yulia Tymoshenko was first called to the Procurator's Office of Ukraine as for the "Kyoto money" case. Tymoshenko was accused of transferring 320 mln euros, the money which had been received from selling Japan a "greenhouse gas emanation quota" to the Ukrainian Pension Fund (in 2009 year of global crisis) instead of spending it for planting forests (as required by Kyoto Protocol). On the 30th of December (on the very eve of the New Year celebration) she was under interrogation during 12 hours in a row (from 12 a.m. to 12 p.m.).

On 16 December 2010 Ukrainian law enforcers started a criminal case against Tymoshenko for illegal use of funds - the money (that Ukraine received for selling their quotas under the Kyoto Protocol) was transferred to the Pension Fund of Ukraine, and used for the payment of pensions to the population of Ukraine.

2) On 27 January 2011 the case on purchasing, in 2009, a thousand of Opel Combo ambulances for the needs of rural medicine was initiated (Tymoshenko was incriminated spending funds in a way that was not envisaged in the 2009 state budget). The cars were supplied from Austria on credit terms (with payment in 2010) at the price of 12.5 thousand euros (the price did not exceed that on the market). Tymoshenko was charged under the article 365, p. 3, the article 364, p. 2, the article 210, p. 2 of the Criminal Code of Ukraine (that is, exceeding official authorities; infringement of Budget Law; abuse of office charges, that led to badly unfavourable consequences).

In all those cases, procurators do not blame Yu. V. Tymoshenko either in stealing the funds, or in doing the damage, the basis of charges being money misuse.

==== Travel restrictions. Tymoshenko’s stay in Brussels on March 24–26, 2011 ====
On 15 December 2010 the General Procurator's Office imposed on Tymoshenko "travel restrictions" as a preventive measure. Yet Tymoshenko managed to leave Ukraine for Brussels where she was present (on March 24–26, 2011) at the summit of the European People's Party at the personal invitations of its leader Wilfried Martens and the US senator John McCain. Tymoshenko had meetings with the European leading politicians like German chancellor Angela Merkel and President Sarkozy.

==== BBC: Authoritative lawyers versus less authoritative auditors (June, 17th, 2011) ====
On 17 June 2011 in Washington there was a press-conference (see YouTube) of an authoritative American law firm "Covington & Burling" and a large auditing company "BDO USA" (having branch offices in more than 100 countries round the world) to which Yulia Tymoshenko and her party "Batkivshchyna" applied with the request to evaluate how justified were the charges incriminated to her, as well as to scrutinize the validity of the report ordered by the Azarov government and made by the American law firms "Trout Cacheris" and "Akin Gump" (their report was submitted on October, the 14th, 2010 and was used as a basis for initiating further charges against Yulia Tymoshenko).

At the above-mentioned conference, the lawyers concluded that:

- "The paragraphs on "Kyoto money" and "Opel Combo ambulances" do not worth the paper on which they were printed... As for the current moment, the charges against the former Prime Minister (Tymoshenko) seem to be political by their origin, so as there are not any facts to substantiate them... Conclusions: The facts revealed by us give ground for secure defending from those charges either in a Ukrainian court or in some international court in case if a justified hearing is not possible within Ukraine"
- "A limited number of documents which have been analyzed by us, show that the agreement between the Austrian firm Vamed and Ukrmedpostach was signed without any mediators. The price for an Opel ambulance did not exceed that on a market’,- state Covington and Burling.

Following this press-conference, the above said cases of Kyoto money and ambulances for rural medicine were suspended by Ukrainian state procurators.

==== Conference "The Future of Ukraine" and "case against Tymoshenko" ====
The total assessment of the whole set of criminal cases was given by David Kramer(executive director of Freedom House) at the conference "The Future of Ukraine: Defiance and Consequences of Administrative Actions" (held on July, 7th, 2011 in Washington) and organized by the Peterson Institution of International Economics, The USA and Europe Centre of the Brookings Institution, The Atlantic Council):

- "Those investigations can not be trusted any more. These are a chain of convictions against Yulia Tymoshenko following one after another until some of them might “shoot”... I'm applying to my colleagues from the Ukrainian government who are present in here. When you are back home and report before the members of your office, tell them to put an end to these. These are shameful!"

== 2009 gas deal with Russia ==
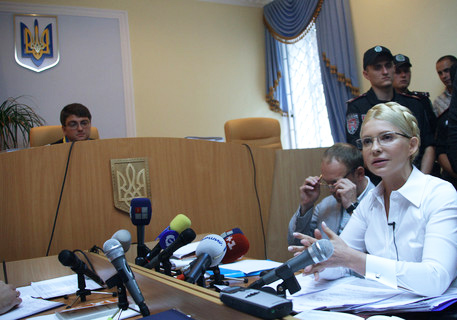
Tymoshenko in court (26 July 2011)

=== Reading the ruling for the gas case – 2009 ===
On June, the 24th, 2011, the Ukrainian General Prosecutor’s Office delivered Yu. Tymoshenko the "Ruling for suing her on charges in compliance with the gas case-2009 (p.3 Article 365 of the Criminal Code of Ukraine – power abusing, or exceeding of office authorities resulted in ill effects", which envisages 7 to 10 years of imprisonment):

- "Prime Minister of Ukraine Tymoshenko Yu. V., acting purposefully and in personal interests, being aware of groundless and baseless requirements from the Russian part during the talks held in presence of her and the leadership of the government of the Russian Federation, the joint stock company Gazprom, and the national joint stock company Naftogaz Ukrainy … made a decision to adopt the a.m. unfavourable for Ukraine conditions" (from the Ruling of the General Procurator's Office of Ukraine to sue Tymoshenko as accused, p. 5, 24 Jun 2011.)

=== The essence of "the gas case" in the report of PACE ===
At the June session of PACE (2013) approved a report that focuses on the gas case of Tymoshenko:

- "47. Ms Tymoshenko was sentenced to a seven-year prison term on the basis of vague abuse-of-office “Excess of authority” – Article 365 of the Ukrainian Criminal Code... 48. The criminal charge against the former prime minister was that the deal struck between her and Russian prime minister Putin was financially disadvantageous to Ukraine and that it had not been approved in writing beforehand by her cabinet. The political deal between the two prime ministers... was reached in a climate of severe crisis, after Mr Putin had ordered that gas supplies to Ukraine and through Ukraine to western Europe be cut on 5 January 2009. See The Economist of 8 January 2009 : ...“some countries felt the effect immediately, in bitterly cold weather. Hungary, Slovakia, Bulgaria and Romania were hit hard, but the gas freeze also affects Germany, France and Italy...” On 17 January 2009, Ms Tymoshenko, who was under intense pressure from the European Union and key western European leaders to unblock the situation, reached an agreement of principle with Mr Putin, in Moscow. On 19 January, Naftogaz and Gazprom signed the contract... After Ms Tymoshenko's return, on 21 January, the cabinet confirmed the contracts, and on 22 January, the flow of Russian gas to Ukraine and to western Europe was fully restored... Astonishingly, the fact that the cabinet approved the deal two days later is not even mentioned in the judgment" (PACE, Committee on Legal Affairs and Human Rights. Rapporteur : Mr Pieter OMTZIGT (Netherlands, EPP/CD). "Keeping political and criminal responsibility separate" (Doc. 13214). 28 May 2013.)

And later in this report said that Tymoshenko could be considered a political prisoner :

- "71. The analysis of key issues as presented above, in light of the criteria for the definition of political prisoners in Resolution 1900 (2012), leads to a fairly compelling result, namely that Ms Tymoshenko must be recognised as a presumed political prisoner" (PACE. "Keeping political and criminal responsibility separate" (Doc. 13214). 28 May 2013.)

=== Hearings of witnesses (from 26.07.2011) ===
Witnesses in the "gas case" were dozens of ex-ministers and known politicians.

As for the 26th of July 2011, it was planned to interrogate 38 witnesses for "the part of prosecution". The judge Kireyev gave admission to witness, for the Tymoshenko part, to just two people (out of 33 claimed) - Alexander Turchinov and Michail Lyvinsky. However even "witnesses for the prosecution part" were testifying, mainly, in favour of Tymoshenko. As a result, Tymoshenko wrote in her Twitter: "Kireyev was banned to call “our” witnesses, he got rebuked even for “theirs” (i.e. witnesses from prosecution)". On July, the 26th, 2011, i.e. just as soon as the process of witnessing started, direct teletransmitting from the trial room stopped.

=== Witnessing by Oleg Dubina, former head of Naftogas, 29.07.2011 ===
The important moment in witnessing by Oleg Dubina (a former Head of Naftogaz) was his proving that "The Gas Agreement of 19.01.2009 was made on provisions that Ukraine could at any moment terminate it without whatever "penalty sanctions from the part of Russia".

- To the Tymoshenko's question whether Ukraine is enabled to cancel the agreement at any moment without whatever penalties, Dubina replied positively : "The agreement foresees penalty sanctions for underutilizing gas, but as for the Agreement itself, I can’t tell you for sure, but, I believe, it may be so".

Oleg Dubina confirmed that the agreement with Russia was set the standard formula - the price of gas is calculated according to the price of oil.

Dynamics of prices of "Oil Brent" (ICE.Brent), USD/barrel. From the site "Commodities. Reviews of prices for oil and metals"
| Year | Jan | Feb | Mar | Apr | May | Jun | Jul | Aug | Sep | Oct | Nov | Dec |
|---|---|---|---|---|---|---|---|---|---|---|---|---|
| 2004 | 31.1 | 31.2 | 33.6 | 33.4 | 38.0 | 35.0 | 38.7 | 42.9 | 43.7 | 49.6 | 42.6 | 39.6 |
| 2005 | 44.3 | 46.1 | 53.3 | 51.6 | 48.9 | 54.5 | 57.9 | 64.4 | 62.8 | 58.6 | 55.4 | 56.9 |
| 2006 | 63.6 | 59.9 | 62.3 | 70.6 | 70.1 | 68.9 | 74.1 | 73.3 | 62.3 | 58.2 | 58.9 | 62.0 |
| 2007 | 54.6 | 58.1 | 62.5 | 67.2 | 68.4 | 71.8 | 78.1 | 71.3 | 78.2 | 83.7 | 92.0 | 91.8 |
| 2008 | 91.3 | 94.8 | 102.8 | 111.1 | 125.6 | 135.1 | 133.5 | 115.0 | 100.2 | 73.8 | 54.6 | 43.6 |
| 2009 | 46.3 | 44.2 | 47.7 | 51.9 | 59.0 | 69.5 | 65.9 | 72.9 | 68.5 | 74.0 | 77.7 | 75.3 |
| 2010 | 76.7 | 75.2 | 80.4 | 85.9 | 76.9 | 75.6 | 75.4 | 77.1 | 78.6 | 83.5 | 86.4 | 92.3 |
| 2011 | 97.2 | 105.0 | 114.8 | 123.3 | 114.0 | 113.4 | 116.7 | 116.88 | 114.45 | 102.15 | 108.60 | 109.00 |
| 2012 | 112.17 | 111.66 | 126.37 | 124.84 | 119.33 | — | — | — | — | — | — | — |

=== Witnessing as for the Yushchenko part ===
It is worth mentioning that at the trial against Tymoshenko almost all the witnesses (Oleg Dubina, Alexander Turchinov in particular) said that it was President Yushchenko himself who had ruined the price of US$235 per a thousand m^{3} of gas agreed by Tymoshenko Cabinet for 2009 year; he had recalled Mr. Dubyna, a Head of Naftogaz, from Moscow (though Yushchenko was not authorized to do that). On the day of Yushchenko witnessing (17.08.2011), Russian mass media sources published the commentary of "a representative from the Kremlin", who said :

- "Yushchenko is lying to the trial… in telephone conversations with Medvedev, Yushchenko assured that he fully trusted Yulia Tymoshenko and that she was given the whole scope of necessary authorities and he was in support of the agreements concluded with Russia".

=== Nagrebelny, an expert from Koretzky Institution of State and Law, 15.08.2011 ===
The "Koretzky Institution of State and Law" is an expert organization in Ukraine; the General Procurator's Office of Ukraine involved the Institution specialists as experts yet at the investigation stage of the gas case.

On the 15th of August, 2011, deputy director of the Institution Vladimir Nagrebelny presented to the trial an expert conclusion according to which Tymoshenko did not exceed her office authorities in the course of gas talks with Russia:

- "By her gas directives, ex-P.M. Yulia Tymoshenko did not exceed her authorities";
- The Institution of State and Law takes the gas directives by Yulia Tymoshenko as "the means necessary for implementation of her duties".

=== Tymoshenko's trial ===
Tymoshenko's trial (she was charged in May 2011) over abuse of office over a natural gas imports contract signed with Russia in January 2009 started on 24 June 2011 in Kyiv. In October 2011 Party of Regions' parliamentary faction leader Oleksandr Yefremov stated that this criminal case against Tymoshenko was initiated by the National Security and Defense Council of Ukraine in February 2009 at the initiative of (then) Ukrainian president Viktor Yushchenko. (A former ally of Tymoshenko) Yushchenko testified against Tymoshenko during the trial; a trial he called "a normal judicial process".

On 5 August 2011 Tymoshenko was arrested for "ridiculing court proceedings" during this trail. At the time Tymoshenko was being held at Lukyanivska Prison. There Tymoshenko (her defence claimed) suffered bruises on the skin and she contracted pneumonia, later followed by back pain. According to Ombudsman Nina Karpachova, Tymoshenko demands that independent doctors took her blood test.

On 11 October 2011, the court found Tymoshenko guilty of abuse of power, sentenced her to seven years in jail, and ordered her to pay the state $188 million. She was convicted for exceeding her powers as Prime Minister, by ordering Naftogaz to sign the gas deal with Russia in 2009. On 11 October 2011 a record number of special units of the Ukrainian militsiya (police) were in Kyiv (The Ministry of Police claimed in a statement about 4,500) Several tens of thousands of demonstrators came to Kyiv to support Tymoshenko.

Tymoshenko did appeal against the sentence on 24 October 2011; which she compared to Stalin's Great Terror.

President Yanukovych and other Government officials have hinted that the law that convicted Tymoshenko could be changed in her benefit. According to opposition politicians, this could have been done as soon as one week after Tymoshenko's conviction. However, after postponing the vote twice, the Parliament of Ukraine voted against decriminalizing abuse of office on 15 November 2011.

Tymoshenko lost her appeal against her sentence of abuse of power of 11 October 2011 on 23 December 2011. She and her lawyers had boycotted the appeal proceedings claiming "Judicial system and justice are totally non-existent in Ukraine today". Tymoshenko has lodged a complaint against the verdict at the European Court of Human Rights, which was given priority treatment by the court.

On 30 December 2011 Tymoshenko was transferred to the Kachanivska penal colony in Kharkiv.

The Parliament of Ukraine again voted against decriminalizing the law under which Tymoshenko was sentenced to imprisonment on 8 February 2012.

On 14 June 2012 Kostyantyn Hryshchenko, the Minister of Foreign Affairs of Ukraine, gave an interview to the national newspaper of Italy Corriere della Sera (Milan) where he said that back in 2009 Tymoshenko violated a law that was in force at that time, giving a permission to sign a gas agreement that was very disadvantageous to Ukraine on the petition of German and other European governments.

On January 26, 2012, Yulia Tymoshenko's defense submitted a cassation appeal to the High Specialized Court for Civil and Criminal Cases regarding the “gas case” verdict. On August 16, 2012, after a 7-month delay that impeded filing the case to the European Court of Human Rights, the panel of judges of the aforementioned court began hearing the case. The panel finished hearing the case on August 21 and went to the jury room to make decision. The ruling of the Court, issued on August 29, 2012, stated that the appeal of ex prime minister Yulia Tymoshenko's defense on the "gas case" should not be satisfied.

Media, diplomats, members of parliament and members of an EU special monitoring mission, Pat Cox and Aleksander Kwasniewski, attended the court sessions. The ruling was announced on the day following public hearing of "Tymoshenko vs Ukraine" (regarding unlawful arrest of ex-prime minister and holding her in custody) case at the European Court of Human Rights.

On 6 September 2013 the High Specialized Court for Civil and Criminal Cases denied the petition made by Tymoshenko's lawyers to allow extraordinary appeal to the Supreme Court of Ukraine. On the 6 October 2013 another petition was dismissed as "lodged on the same ground as previously denied petition".

After the Ukrainian revolution of November 2013-February 2014 the High Specialized Court for Civil and Criminal Cases grant the petition that was made by Yulia Tymoshenko herself and send the case to the Supreme Court of Ukraine. On 14 April 2014 Ukrainian Supreme Court sitting en banc reversed the conviction of Yulia Tymoshenko and closed the case against her on the ground that "no crime was committed".

== Non-delivery by United Energy Systems of Ukraine (in 1996) of goods to Russia ==
Early in July 2011, the Ukrainian security service (USB) opened a new criminal investigation into alleged non-delivery by United Energy Systems of Ukraine (in 1996) of goods to Russia for $405.5 million, the USB maintains that Russia may claim this sum to the State budget of Ukraine (this criminal case was closed : in Ukraine in January 2005 due to lack of evidence; in Russia in December 2005 years by reason of lapse of time).

Colonel-General Leonid Ivashov (former official of the Russian Ministry of Defense) said that Russia has long since forgiven this debt and has closed the case against Yulia Tymoshenko: "The new criminal case – it's cheating".

The trial for the in July 2011 opened criminal investigation into alleged misappropriating public funds of United Energy Systems of Ukraine started on 19 April 2012 in Kharkiv. Tymoshenko refused to attend the trial, citing problems with her health. Kyivsky District Court of Kharkiv closed the criminal case on 28 February 2014.

=== 2001 criminal case on state funds embezzlement and tax evasion ===
A 2001 criminal case on state funds embezzlement and tax evasion charges against Tymoshenko was reopened in Ukraine on 24 October 2011.

=== Ukrainian tax police ===
On 4 November 2011 the Ukrainian tax police resumed four criminal cases against Tymoshenko. She was charged for these cases on 10 November 2011.

Tymoshenko was re-arrested (while in prison) on 8 December 2011, after a Ukrainian court ordered her indefinite arrest, as part of the investigation of alleged tax evasion and theft of government funds in 1996–1997 by United Energy Systems of Ukraine; again the European Union showed concern over this.

== Involvement in the murder of Yevhen Shcherban ==
Since late October 2011 Ukrainian prosecutors are investigating whether Tymoshenko was involved in the murder of businessman and lawmaker Yevhen Shcherban. Since early April 2012 the General Prosecutor's Office is examining the involvement of Tymoshenko and former prime minister Pavlo Lazarenko in the murder of Donetsk businessman Olexandr Momot in 1996.

(Per July 2012) the First Deputy Prosecutor General of Ukraine Renat Kuzmin had intentions to incriminate murder charges against Tymoshenko for the murder of Yevhen Shcherban that occurred back in 1996. In 1996 Prosecutor General Mykhailo Potebenko had stated there were no grounds to open a case.

On 18 January 2013, Tymoshenko was notified that she is a suspect in the murder of Scherban, his wife and two other people in 1996. Tymoshenko denied the charges and according to Tymoshenko not she, but President Yanukovych had benefited most of the murder of Shcherban.

In February 2013 Tymoshenko and her lawyer Serhiy Vlasenko were fined both $2,000 for "contempt of court"; Tymoshenko was fined for being absent in court and Vlasenko for "violating order in the courtroom".

== Criminal case against Tymoshenko's lawyer ==
On 21 January 2013 Tymoshenko's lawyer Serhiy Vlasenko stated that he stands accused of car theft, robbery and failing to obey a court ruling stemming from his divorce several years ago.

== Tymoshenko's health in prison ==
On 30 December 2011 Tymoshenko was transferred to the Kachanivska penal colony in Kharkiv.

Three Canadian and two German doctors who were allowed to examine Tymoshenko in February 2012 stated that Tymoshenko was “ill, in constant pain and requires toxicology and other laboratory testing.” The Canadian doctors added that the doctors were not allowed to carry out some tests and were hindered in their work by government officials. Ukrainian officials insisted that Tymoshenko was receiving all necessary treatment. The First Deputy Chairman of Parliament's health care committee and Tymshenko's former physician, Viacheslav Perederiy, stated "The medical station has the standards of a squalid rural first-aid post. There were banal instruments there that were not even plugged into the mains. They just picked a room, painted the walls and made those who were inside wear overshoes and gowns as though there was any sterility there."

Tymoshenko was moved against her will from Kachanivska prison to a hospital on 19 April 2012 where she entered a hungerstrike on 20 April to protest – according to her lawyer Serhiy Vlasenko – "what is happening in the country and what is happening to her in prison". She ended the hungerstrike on 9 May 2012. Since 9 May 2012 she is receiving treatment at the hospital after being diagnosed with a spinal disc herniation

On 22 January 2013 Tymoshenko's defense lawyer, Serhiy Vlasenko stated that her health situation had worsened, "she cannot walk".

== Hunger strikes ==
Tymoshenko shows bruises on her body — guards punched her in the stomach and twisted her arms and legs while transporting her to a local hospital against her will to be treated for her spinal condition. (27 April 2012)

Tymoshenko was on hunger strike from 20 April 2012 till 9 May 2012. According to her lawyer, she was protesting against "what is happening in the country and what is happening to her in prison".

European leaders expressed concern over the alleged mistreatment of Tymoshenko. EU Commission President Jose Manuel Barroso and Justice Commissioner Viviane Reding boycotted the Euro 2012 football tournament held in Ukraine and Poland. French public figures have appealed to FIFA, the world football authority, to cancel Euro 2012. Germany has announced that German chancellor Angela Merkel's visit would depend on Tymoshenko fate. Ukraine compared the threats of a football boycott by European powers as a return to Cold War tactics. The German President, Joachim Gauck canceled a visit to Ukraine. Ukrainian authorities confirmed that the presidents of Austria, Germany, Italy, the Czech Republic, and Slovenia would no longer attend a summit to be held in Ukraine on 11 to 12 May 2012 (on 8 May 2012 Ukraine postponed this summit). Meanwhile, Switzerland offered to mediate between Ukraine and the European Union to resolve the issue on neutral grounds. Tymoshenko ended her hunger strike and was transferred to a hospital near Kharkiv on 9 May 2012, accompanied by German neurologist Lutz Harms of the Charité clinic Berlin.

From 29 October 2012 till 16 November 2012 Tymoshenko was again on hunger strike to protest vote rigging in the October 2012 Ukrainian parliamentary election. She stated that the goal for which she went on a hunger strike had been achieved "Nobody will be able to recognize this Verkhovna Rada as legitimate and democratically elected".

From 25 November till 6 December 2013 (during the Euromaidan protests) Tymoshenko was again on hunger strike in protest of "President Yanukovych's reluctance to sign the DCFTA (free trade areas established by European Union and Ukraine)" on 6 December 2013.

== Opinions ==
- On June 16, 2013 Zerkalo Nedeli published an article of Juris Doctor Mykola Khavronyuk where he provides statistical evidences of the State Court Administration of Ukraine which show that more than often persons convicted of the same crime as Tymoshenko are usually given a conditional sentence or even completely pardoned. He points out that in 2012 out 25 people with same charges (part 3 of the article 365 of the Criminal Code of Ukraine) only seven were sentenced to a prison of whom only three people to the term of five to ten years. Fifteen (60%) of the convicted were given a probation, while another nine were completely pardoned either due to amnesty or other issues. A very similar situation is traced for the previous year in 2011. Out of 46 people on the same charges only 15 were sentenced to a prison out which six were given term of five to ten years. Twenty-eight of the convicted were given a probation while another seven were completely pardoned.

== Foreign reactions ==
European Union – In August 2011 European Union (EU) officials called the prosecution of Tymoshenko "selective prosecution of political opponents". After the verdict in the 2009 natural gas deal European Union High Representative for Foreign Affairs Catherine Ashton stated the verdict showed justice in Ukraine was being applied selectively in politically motivated prosecutions and that the Ukrainian Government handling of the case risked deep implications for its hopes of EU integration. Other reactions from European Union politicians had a similar tone. Ukrainian president Viktor Yanukovych met with the EU-leadership the week after the verdict was postponed, but Ukraine and the EU assured this would not affect further cooperation. Nevertheless, the EU has shelved the European Union Association Agreement and Deep and Comprehensive Free Trade Agreement with Ukraine over this issue and the imprisonment of Yuriy Lutsenko. At the request of opposition politicians in Ukraine, EU government officials boycotted the UEFA Euro 2012 championship in Ukraine.

The Council of Europe expressed "serious concern about the trial" on 12 October 2011. On 26 January 2012 the Parliamentary Assembly of the Council of Europe adopted a resolution in which it called on President Yanukovych "to consider all possible means to release former prime minister Yulia Tymoshenko and other members of the former government and also to enable them to participate in the upcoming parliamentary elections".

On 29 February 2012 the European People's Party demanded "immediate release of Yulia Tymoshenko, Yuriy Lutsenko and other political prisoners; it also insisted the Association Agreement between Ukraine and the European Union should not be signed and ratified until these demands were met.

Russia – According to Russia, the 2009 natural gas agreements "were signed on the basis of the necessary instructions from the Russian and Ukrainian Presidents"; it also urged Ukraine to ensure an impartial trial. The Russian Foreign Ministry stated the ruling had an "obvious anti-Russian subtext" and Russian Prime Minister Vladimir Putin commented about the ruling "I can't quite understand why she got those seven years".

United States – In August 2011 United States officials (also) called the prosecution of Tymoshenko "selective prosecution of political opponents". An 11 October 2011 statement by the White House stated the charges and conduct of the trial has raised serious concerns about Ukraine's commitment to democracy and the rule of law and urged Ukraine to release Tymoshenko, as well as other political leaders and former government officials. On 22 January 2012 U.S. Secretary of State Hillary Clinton reaffirmed that the United States supported Tymoshenko's immediate release. On 22 September 2012 the U.S. Senate called upon Ukraine to release Tymoshenko and for the U.S. Department of State to institute a visa ban against those responsible for her imprisonment and mistreatment.

United Nations – On 12 October 2011 United Nations Secretary General Ban Ki-moon expressed concerns over the conviction.

France – France's Ambassador-at-large for Human Rights, François Zimeray, attempted twice to visit Tymoshenko in jail in January and April 2012.

The co-president of The Greens–European Free Alliance group in the European Parliament Rebecca Harms (Germany) announced that she will insist on the order of the European Union on conducting an inspection of documents relating the "gas affair" against Tymoshenko. She believes that the allegations are absurd and baseless. She reported that she recently familiarized herself with the results of investigation of the former Prosecutor General of Denmark, which indicate that Tymoshenko was not supposed to be convicted in this case. In her opinion the Ukrainian authorities and the president of Ukraine, Viktor Yanukovych, have realized already that they are going in the wrong direction and that is why other criminal cases were opened against Tymoshenko.

Amnesty International called for Tymoshenko's immediate release (on 12 October 2011).

== Possible pardoning ==
Ukrainian president Viktor Yanukovych stated on 24 February 2012 the procedure for pardoning Tymoshenko could start "after her trial" and if she submitted a respective application to the president; he also mentioned that "we should have all these cases considered again from the point of view of the new Criminal Procedure Code, which will comply with all European standards" and he described the trial of Tymoshenko and other former officials as not "meet[ing] European standards and principles" (in May 2012 First Deputy General Prosecutor of Ukraine Renat Kuzmin also stated this in the European Parliament). On 27 February 2012 Tymoshenko's defense lawyer stated Tymoshenko will not file any applications for a pardon since "Yanukovych recognized himself that the trial of Tymoshenko has nothing to do with justice according to European standards". Tymoshenko stated the same day "Today we are behind bars. But if we have to pay such a price for the liberation of the country, then we are ready to pay it".

More than 100 various petitions for pardoning Tymoshenko have been sent to President Yanukovych since her imprisonment.

== 2014 release from prison ==
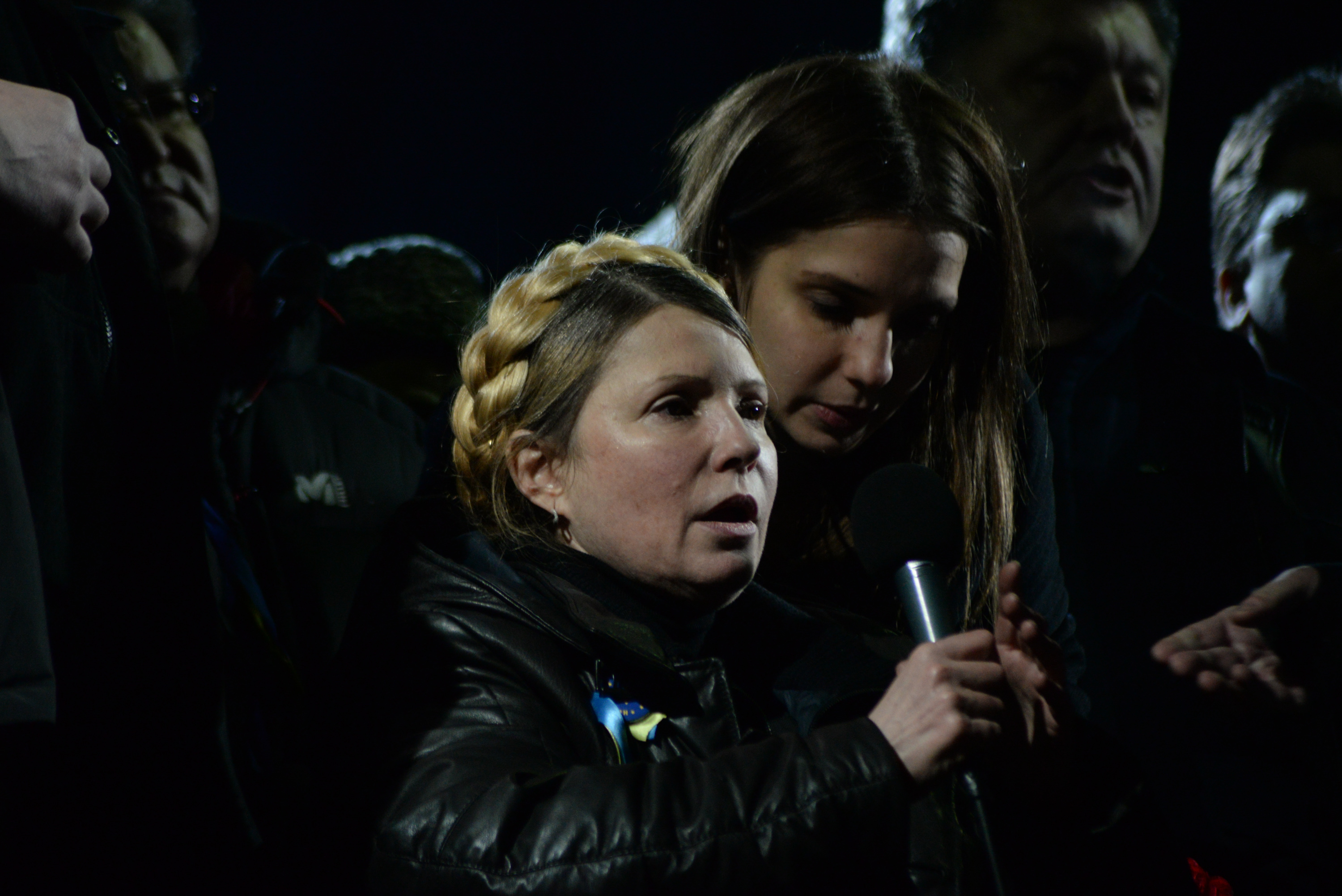
Tymoshenko addressing Euromaidan with a speech, Kyiv, February 22, 2014

Following the 2014 Ukrainian Revolution, on 21 February 2014, Parliament voted for her release in a 310–54 veto-proof vote. To do so, the members of parliament decriminalized the Article on which Tymoshenko was charged and brought it into compliance with Article 19 of the UN Convention against corruption. That could enable immediate release of Tymoshenko through the corresponding court ruling. Viktor Yanukovych didn't sign the law, fled the country after massive violent clashes in Kyiv, when the police shot more than 100 demonstrators in the center of Kyiv. On February 22, 2014, the Verkhovna Rada with 322 votes adopted a decree based on the decision of the European Court of Human Rights and corresponding decision of the Committee of Ministers of the Council of Europe.

On the same day Tymoshenko was released from the Kharkiv-based Central Clinical Hospital No. 5, where she had been receiving treatment after being diagnosed with a spinal disc herniation since May 2012 under police surveillance. Her release was praised by western leaders.

== Legal rehabilitation ==
On February 28, 2014, the parliament rehabilitated Yulia Tymoshenko and restored her rights. That enabled her to run for office, however she has ruled out becoming Prime Minister again.

Kyivsky District Court of Kharkiv closed the criminal case on financial abuse of the United Energy Systems of Ukraine on 28 February 2014. And on April 14 the Supreme Court of Ukraine closed the “gas case” against Tymoshenko for “absence of a criminal act”.

On 25 April 2014 the General Prosecutor of Ukraine launched a pre-trial investigation against a number of officials from its own office and the Pechersky district court and Kyiv's court of appeals (the judges who had sentenced Tymoshenko) because of "deliberate, systematic and flagrant violation of accused Yulia Tymoshenko’s rights to defense, which are granted by Ukraine’s current laws".

On 24 June 2014 the Supreme Court of Ukraine rehabilitated Tymoshenko.

=== Aftermath ===
Rodion Kireyev, the judge who had sentenced Tymoshenko to seven years in jail (on 11 October 2011) was charged for "giving a deliberately unlawful verdict" on 20 June 2014. Kireyev disappeared from Kyiv on 2 July 2014 and was placed on the wanted list on 7 July 2014. He was dismissed from his office by President Petro Poroshenko on 18 January 2016.

== Manafort effort to discredit Tymoshenko ==
According to an investigation led by Alan Friedman of The Guardian, the 2011 case against Tymoshenko was fabricated by Viktor Yanukovych. He hired American political consultant Paul Manafort, who created a strategy to discredit Tymoshenko abroad. Rick Gates, Manafort's then-deputy, and Konstantin Kilimnik, another senior Manafort associate who the FBI believes has links to Russian military intelligence, both collaborated with The Guardian's investigation.

In 2012, the law firm Skadden, Arps, Slate, Meagher & Flom was hired to produce a report for the Ukrainian Ministry of Justice defending the prosecution of Tymoshenko as part of Manafort's efforts to improve Ukraine's international image. The report was worked on by Alex van der Zwaan and Gregory Craig. van der Zwaan, a Dutch attorney at Skadden's London office and son-in-law of Russian oligarch German Khan, pleaded guilty in February 2018 to lying to the FBI about the nature of his work on the report and his contacts with Kilimnik, and to destroying evidence sought by the Mueller investigation. He was sentenced to 30 days in federal prison and ordered to pay a $20,000 fine. In January 2019, Skadden agreed to forfeit to the U.S. government the $4.6 million it had received from the Ministry and to retroactively register as a foreign agent. Craig, a partner at Skadden and former White House Counsel in the Obama administration, was indicted in April 2019 for his role in lying to the U.S. government about the extent of the firm's work for the Ministry and altering documents as part of the attempted coverup.

== 2026 bribery case ==
In 2026, Tymoshenko was investigated by the National Anti-Corruption Bureau of Ukraine (NABU) on allegations that she had organised a scheme to bribe Verkhovna Rada members in exchange for their votes. Tymoshenko denied the allegations and said they were politically motivated. She was released on bail of about $762,000.
