= First Yanukovych government =

Government of Ukraine

First Yanukovych Government
- 9th Cabinet of Ukraine (since 1990)

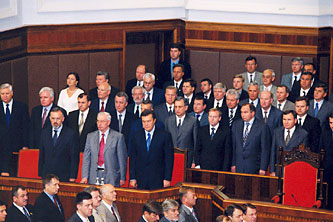
- Date formed: 21 November 2002
- Date dissolved: 5 January 2005

People and organisations
- Head of state: Leonid Kuchma
- Head of government: Viktor Yanukovych
- Deputy head of government: Mykola Azarov
- No. of ministers: 20
- Member party: Party of Regions; Social Democratic Party of Ukraine (united); Labour Ukraine
- Status in legislature: Majority
- Opposition party: Our-Ukraine; Yulia Tymoshenko Bloc
- Opposition leader: Viktor Yushchenko; Yulia Tymoshenko

History
- Legislature term: 5 years
- Predecessor: Kinakh government
- Successor: First Tymoshenko government

The first Yanukovych Government was the Ukrainian cabinet of ministers between 21 November 2002 and 5 January 2005, led by Prime Minister Viktor Yanukovych. Yanukovych had been elected Prime Minister of Ukraine with 234 votes, only 8 more than needed.

On December 1, 2004 (during the Orange Revolution) the Ukrainian Parliament passed a vote of no-confidence. The government supported NATO membership of Ukraine (2002) and sent Ukrainian troops to Iraq in 2003.

== Composition ==
- Viktor Yanukovych – Prime Minister
- Mykola Azarov – First Deputy Prime Minister
- Vitaly Hayduk – Deputy Prime Minister for fuel and energy complex
- Ivan Kyrylenko – Deputy Prime Minister
- Dmytro Tabachnyk – Deputy Prime Minister for humanitarian issues
- Serhy Ryzhuk – Agricultural Policy
- Yury Smirnov – Interior Affairs
- Vasyl Shevchuk – Environment and Natural Resources
- Valery Khoroshkovsky – Economy and European Integration
- Anatoliy Zlenko – Foreign Affairs
- Hryhory Reva – Emergency Situations and Chernobyl Cleanup
- Yury Bohutsky – Culture and the Regions
- General Volodymyr Shkidchenko – Defence
- Vasyl Kremen – Education and Science
- Andry Pidayev – Health
- Oleksandr Lavrynovych – Justice
- Serhy Yermilov – Fuel and Energy
- Mikhail Papiyev – Labour and Social Policy
- Anatoliy Myalytsya – Industrial Policy
- Heorhiy Kirpa – Transport
