= 2009 Russia–Ukraine gas dispute =

Political conflict

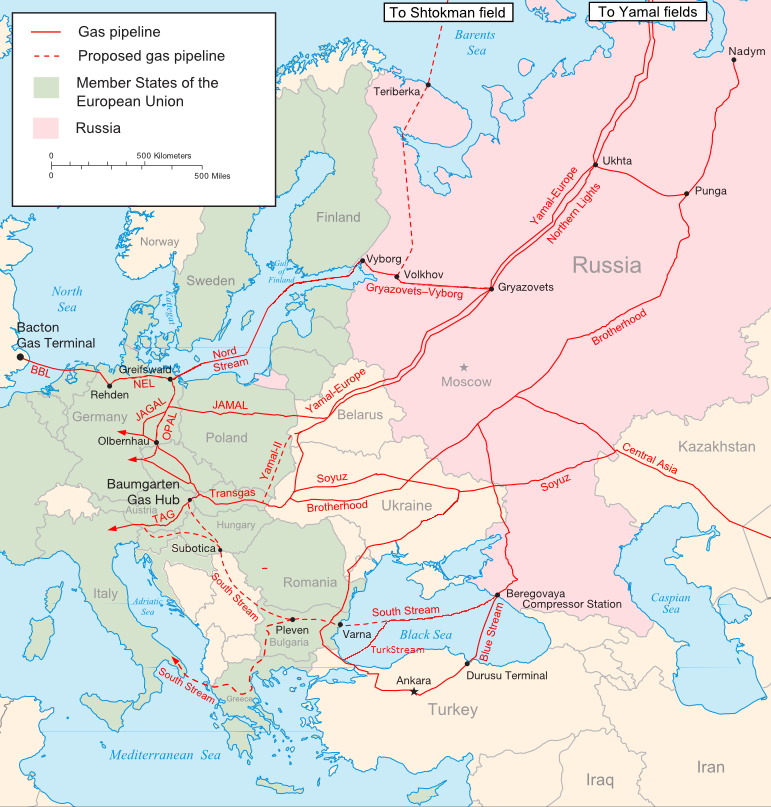
Natural gas pipelines from Russia to Europe.

In 2009, Russian natural gas company Gazprom refused to conclude a supply contract unless Ukrainian gas company Naftogaz paid its accumulating debts for previous gas supplies. The dispute began in the closing weeks of 2008 with a series of failed negotiations, and on January 1, 2009 Russia cut off gas supplies to Ukraine. On January 7 the dispute turned to crisis when all Russian gas flows through Ukraine were halted for 13 days, completely cutting off supplies to Southeastern Europe, most of which depends on Russian gas, and partially to other European countries.

Throughout the crisis the Russian and Ukrainian sides blamed each other for the cutoff. On January 11 and 12, the European Union deployed an independent monitoring mission in an attempt to solve the crisis, but the mission met with little success. On January 12, Gazprom announced that it was willing to start delivering gas through the Sudzha metering station into the pipeline that traverses Ukraine towards Southeastern Europe, but Ukraine refused the offer for technical reasons and instead suggested an alternative route through Valuyki and Pisarevka metering stations, additionally insisting that supplies be fully restored. This was refused by Gazprom.

On January 18 the dispute was resolved when Russian prime minister Vladimir Putin and his Ukrainian counterpart Yulia Tymoshenko negotiated a new contract that covered the next ten years. (On October 11, 2011, a Ukrainian court sentenced Tymoshenko to seven years in prison for abuse of office in her role of signing this deal. In the aftermath of Euromaidan, this sentence was overturned under suspicion of being political reprisal from her 2010 Presidential election rival Viktor Yanukovych, and the judge who handed down the sentence fled the country after being charged with giving a "deliberately unlawful verdict.")

Gas flows to Europe restarted on the morning of January 20, and were fully restored within two days. In the aftermath, Gazprom was estimated to have lost US$1.5 billion in revenues due to lack of sales, and Ukraine was speculated to have incurred major economic losses. Analysts point out that the crisis had a negative and possibly irreversible impact on the reputations of both Russia as an energy supplier, and Ukraine as a transit country. There is no consensus amongst analysts on who bore the most responsibility for the crisis. Due to the absence of international monitors on both sides of the Ukrainian pipeline system, it is impossible to determine with certainty who was responsible for interrupting gas flow to Europe.

== Background ==
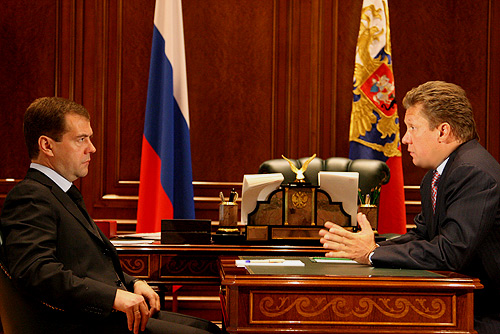
President Medvedev meets with Gazprom CEO Alexei Miller in his office in the Kremlin (July 21, 2008)

Throughout 2008 there were numerous contract and pricing disputes between Russian and Ukrainian gas/transit companies. In October 2008, Ukrainian prime minister Yulia Tymoshenko and Russian prime minister Vladimir Putin signed a deal that included provisions to raise import prices and transit tariffs to "market, economically based and mutually agreed levels" within three years, and that Naftogaz would buy gas directly from Gazprom and be the sole importer to Ukraine, removing intermediaries. In November, Gazprom and Naftogaz signed a long-term contract with similar provisions; however, this document differed in that it referred to transit fees remaining at their 2008 level and didn't specify an import price.

In the third week of November, Gazprom CEO Miller announced that if no agreement was reached by the end of the year, prices could rise significantly higher than what was currently being proposed. A few days later Prime Minister Putin warned that if there was any interference with transit gas, supplies to Ukraine would be cut off. These warnings were repeated throughout December, with additional warnings that disruptions to European supplies could result. The European Commission did not attempt to intervene, but the Energy Charter Secretariat issued a statement on December 23 which recalled the principle of uninterrupted transit. This was seen as a reminder to Ukraine of its obligations under the Energy Charter Treaty, which it has signed and, unlike Russia, ratified.

Large amounts of debt remained outstanding by year's end. Naftogaz CEO Vladimir Trykolych said that Naftogaz owed $1.26–1.27 billion to RosUkrEnergo in total, but claimed that Naftogaz had no debt to Gazprom. However, on December 2, Naftogaz acknowledged that it owed $1 billion to Gazprom, and said it was having trouble making payments on time due to unexpected losses in 2008. Later in mid-December, Gazprom stated that a debt of $2.195 billion had accumulated. In response, Naftogaz made a payment of $800 million, and promised to pay another $200 million soon. Gazprom proposed to make an upfront transit payment at the 2008 rate in order to provide funds for the debt to be cleared, but Naftogaz rejected the offer.

On December 19, Gazprom released a statement saying that no supply contract could be signed for 2009 because Ukraine said it would not make any more payments in 2008. This was denied by a Naftogaz spokesman. On the same day, Ukrainian president Viktor Yushchenko's spokesman on international energy security stated that Ukraine had paid for its October and September supplies, and that although it still had to pay for November's supply before the end of 2008, no other payments would be due until the end of January. On December 23, President Yushchenko said that part of the debt was restructured for January – February 2009, but Gazprom denied that there was any such agreement and said that it remained committed to cut supplies to Ukraine on January 1 if Ukraine did not pay its remaining $1.67 billion debt for gas supplies and an additional $450 million in fines.

By December 30, Naftogaz made a payment of $1.522 billion to RosUkrEnergo for outstanding gas deliveries. RosUkrEnergo confirmed receiving this payment but said that Naftogaz still owed $614 million in fines, (although later on January 2, Naftogaz insisted that no further amounts of debt were outstanding, and said it was ready to go to international arbitration to resolve the issue). Along with the payment, the chief executive of Naftogaz, Oleh Dubyna, wrote a letter to Gazprom threatening that if it delivered gas for transit to Europe, Naftogaz would consider the gas to belong to an "unidentified owner" and could confiscate it under Ukrainian customs law. This was received as a threat to divert gas as Ukraine had done during the 2006 gas dispute.

On December 31, after which gas supplies to Ukraine would be cut off, the two parties failed to come to an agreement on import and transit prices, and obstacles remained. Naftogaz promised to transit gas to Europe even if supplies to Ukraine were cut, however, it added that without a contract in place it would not supply technical gas and would instead take gas from Russia's volumes to keep the system functioning. Gazprom refused, arguing that this would be theft.

== Crisis ==
=== Gas supplies to Ukraine cut off ===
Deliveries of 90 mmcm (million cubic meters) of natural gas per day designated to Ukraine were fully cut on January 1, 2009 at 10:00 MSK. Transit deliveries to the EU continued at a volume of 300 mmcm per day. President Yushchenko and Prime Minister Tymoshenko, in a joint statement, confirmed that Ukraine guaranteed the uninterrupted transit of gas to Europe. They also promised that Ukrainian citizens would be provided with gas in full volume from Ukraine's gas storage facilities. According to Viachaslau Herasimovich, energy analyst at independent think-tank CASE Ukraine, Ukraine had enough natural gas to last between 100 and 110 days without Russian gas (reserves in underground storage were enough to last about 80 days, plus extra days from the amount of gas Ukraine itself could produce before the exhaustion of existing reserves).

President Yushchenko sent a letter to President of the European Commission Jose Manuel Barroso on January 1, proposing the European Union's involvement in settling the dispute. According to Interfax-Ukraine, this proposal was first initiated by the EU. A Ukrainian delegation of representatives was then sent to the Czech Republic (holding the current EU Presidency) to hold consultations with a number of EU member states.

On January 3, Naftogaz claimed that Gazprom had not paid the transit fees since January 1 and owed it $40 million. According to Gazprom, the transit fee was based on a long-term contract which was signed by both parties on June 21, 2002, and would expire at the end of 2013.

On January 4, two days after gas supplies to Europe were first reported to be falling, the Czech EU Presidency, on behalf of the EU, made a statement calling for an "urgent solution" to the dispute, and for an "immediate resumption" of full deliveries of gas to the EU member states. According to the statement, "energy relations between the EU and its neighbours should be based on reliability and predictability." On the same day both RosUkrEnergo and Gazprom filed lawsuits against Ukraine and Naftogaz respectively with the Stockholm Tribunal of the Arbitration Institute of the Stockholm Chamber of Commerce. Russia and Ukraine also said they would file lawsuits at the arbitration court.

On January 5, Kyiv's economic court ruled to ban Naftogaz from transiting Russian gas in 2009 at a price of $1.60 per 1,600 cubic meters per 100 kilometers. The court decided to satisfy a ministry appeal that declared ineffective agreements on Russian gas transit via Ukraine "because the agreements were signed by the former deputy head of the Naftogaz Ukrainy board, Ihor Voronin, who was not empowered by the Cabinet of Ministers of Ukraine to do that", according to the statement.

=== Gas supplies to Europe cut off ===
Red: Severely affected countries; Pink: Partially affected.

On January 5, in a televised conversation between Prime Minister Vladimir Putin and Gazprom CEO Alexei Miller, Putin agreed with a proposal by Miller to reduce gas flows to Europe via Ukraine. Putin elaborated that the gas flow should be reduced by the amount Ukraine had allegedly stolen since deliveries ended on January 1, and instructed Miller to inform Gazprom's European partners.

On January 6, Gazprom deputy CEO Aleksandr Medvedev stated at press conferences in both London and Berlin that Ukraine had blocked three of the four transit lines "in an unprecedented and unilateral move". Naftogaz denied the accusation and said it had used its own gas for technical purposes. President Yushchenko stated that during the course of the day Gazprom had sharply cut supplies to Europe via Ukraine from 262 mmcm to 73.6 mmcm. Later a Gazprom spokesman stated that Gazprom had only put 64.7 mmcm into the system, and that it was expecting Ukraine to make up the remaining 65.3 mmcm needed to make the total order of 130 mmcm. In a telegram sent to the leadership of the European Union and heads of European states that consume Russian natural gas, President Yushchenko said "Ukraine consumes only the gas it produces itself and gas pumped into Ukrainian storage facilities, which has been paid for in full". The president also claimed that Russia planned to stop or significantly reduce Russian gas transit through Ukraine.

On January 7, all Russian gas flow through Ukraine was halted, completely cutting off supplies to Southeastern Europe, much of which is completely reliant on Russian gas, and partially to other parts of Europe. Miller stated that Gazprom had stopped all gas deliveries to Ukraine because Ukraine had closed the system down, but Naftogaz said it closed down the system because Gazprom had stopped delivering gas. Prime Minister Putin accused Ukraine of blackmail; Ukraine denied the charges and blamed Russia for stopping gas deliveries to Europe. According to the Ukrainian presidential envoy for international energy security, Bohdan Sokolovsky, Ukraine had no technical capability to stop the pumping of Russian gas into its territory. He claimed that all pumping stations through which gas is supplied to Ukraine are located in Russia.

On January 8, the European Union released a six-point declaration. The declaration stated that Russia and Ukraine had failed to show sufficient determination in solving the problem which was damaging to both their reputations. It urged both Russia and Ukraine to fulfil their respective obligations as supplier and transit country and to immediately restore gas supplies to Europe. It also requested that both parties accept independent monitoring of the flow of gas in the pipelines. Later in the day officials from Gazprom and Naftogaz met with EU officials in Brussels to look for an end to the crisis. Ukraine agreed to guarantee the unimpeded transit of natural gas on the condition that Gazprom would guarantee and supply the technical gas that was required for the system to function, but this was rejected by Russia, as it considered this the responsibility of Ukraine.

On January 11, Putin stated that Russia was willing to take part in the privatization of Ukraine's gas transport system if Ukraine agreed. He also suggested that the EU should lend Ukraine the cash to pay off its debts.

=== EU monitoring agreement ===
On January 7, after Russian gas deliveries to Europe through Ukraine were completely halted, German chancellor Angela Merkel phoned both the Russian and Ukrainian prime ministers and reached an agreement with them that "experts from the European gas industry and the EU be sent quickly to determine on both sides of the Russia–Ukraine border..the cause of the transmission problems". For the next four or five days the commission focused on coming up with terms of reference for an agreement to be signed by all parties.

On January 9, the Gas Coordination Group met and discussed different measures to help the situation, including temporary increases in production, increasing storage withdrawal, fuel switching, and increasing LNG imports.

On January 10, the EU continued talks with Russia to finalize details of the written protocol. After several hours of negotiations, Czech Prime Minister Mirek Topolánek and Prime Minister Putin reached an agreement on conditions for the monitoring arrangement. European Commissioner Andris Piebalgs confirmed that he was also ready to sign the agreement, which left only Ukraine's signature needed in order to start the monitoring operation.

On January 11, Topolánek flew to Kyiv where he presented the agreement to Ukrainian representatives, and Ukraine signed the protocol. However, Prime Minister Tymoshenko added the handwritten words "with declaration attached" next to her signature. The added declaration included, among other things, a clause asserting that Ukraine did not steal gas earmarked for Europe, a demand that Russia must provide Ukraine with 21 mmcm of technical gas daily, free of charge, and that Ukraine had no outstanding debts to Gazprom, effectively blaming the Russian side for the crisis. Russia was not willing to accept this, and another day was lost. Topolánek later told Putin during a telephone conversation that Ukraine's declarations were non-binding and only represented the opinion of Ukraine, but Putin asked Topolánek to send Russia a protocol without any additions and declarations. After a phone call by European Commission President Jose Manuel Barroso that same day, Tymoshenko agreed to separate the two documents.

On January 12, all three parties re-signed the protocol without any amendments and monitors were deployed. The monitoring mission included the EU Commission's officials, experts from the European gas companies, such as E.ON Ruhrgas, Eni and GDF Suez, as well as representatives of Gazprom, Naftogaz, and the Ukrainian and Russian energy ministries. Originally Ukraine did not accepted Gazprom's demand to include Gazprom's experts in the mission, but the objection was later withdrawn. This arrangement was criticized by the Deputy Foreign Minister of Ukraine Kostyantyn Yeliseyev, who said that Ukraine risked losing control over its gas transit system with the inclusion of monitors from European companies in which Gazprom is a shareholder. He claimed it was "another attempt by the Russians to deprive Ukraine of its entire gas transit system."

=== Attempts to restore gas supplies ===
Although international monitors had been deployed, it became clear by the next day that they would have nothing to monitor, as mutual accusations between Russia and Ukraine over who was responsible for blocking gas flow continued. The Russian side claimed that its attempts to restore gas flow were still being blocked, while the Ukrainian side argued that no supplies could be received because no technical agreement had been reached between the parties. Naftogaz sent a letter to Gazprom CEO Alexei Miller arguing that Gazprom was not only responsible for supplying technical gas, but also additional linepack gas of 140 million cubic metres (4.9 billion cubic feet) in order to restart the system.

On January 12, Gazprom announced that it was ready to start delivering gas through the Sudzha metering station that traverses Ukraine towards Southeastern Europe, but Ukraine refused the offer, claiming this would have left its eastern regions of Donetsk, Luhansk and portions of Dnipropetrovsk starved of gas. Naftogaz suggested an alternative route through the Valuyki and Pisarevka metering stations, but later added that it was unprepared to partially accept gas for transfer to Europe. It insisted that deliveries be fully restored because the system had been partially reconfigured to work in reverse in order to supply consumers in eastern Ukraine with backup supplies, and European transit pipelines were working in such a way that they were unable to accept Russian gas for transit to Europe without cutting off those eastern regions. Naftogaz added that a resumption of transit would require conclusion of a technical agreement. According to a report by the Oxford Institute for Energy Studies: "This reversal of one of the world’s largest gas transit systems was unprecedented. It seems hard to believe that it could have been undertaken spontaneously, which suggests that, whichever side precipitated the shutdown, Naftogaz's engineers had prepared for it." Gazprom rejected this counterproposal, saying that the Valuyki and Pisarevka routes were unsuitable for deliveries to Europe.

Signing of the deal reached by Oleh Dubyna and Alexey Miller (with Yulia Tymoshenko and Vladimir Putin standing in the background)

On January 17, Russia held an international gas conference in Moscow, inviting the heads of states and governments of all countries buying or transporting Russian gas. The proposal was met with little enthusiasm, but the EU stated that it would attend under the precondition that Ukraine's participation was ensured. Ukraine agreed and was represented by Prime Minister Tymoshenko, who was given full mandate at the talks. The EU was represented by the Czech Minister of Industry and Trade Martin Říman and the EU Energy Commissioner Andris Piebalgs.

The summit did not achieve a solution to the crisis, but negotiations continued bilaterally between prime ministers Putin and Tymoshenko afterwards.

=== Crisis resolved ===
On January 18, after a day of talks, Putin and Tymoshenko reached a deal on restoring gas supplies to both Europe and Ukraine. The parties agreed, among other things, that Ukraine would get a 20% discount for 2009 gas supplies on condition that the tariff for transporting Russian gas to European consumers through Ukraine remained at 2008 prices for the duration of the year, and that starting on January 1, 2010, all prices and tariffs would move to European standards, without any exemptions or discounts. The two sides also agreed to stop using intermediaries, referring to RosUkrEnergo, a company joint owned by Gazprom and two Ukrainian businessmen. The next day, the head of Gazprom, Alexei Miller, along with the head of Naftogaz, Oleh Dubyna, signed the agreement, and Putin announced that he had ordered Gazprom to start deliveries in full volume and through all necessary routes. Additionally, the claim of a $600 million debt owed to RosUkrEnergo by Naftogaz was dropped. The deal was to remain in force until the end of 2019.

On January 20, gas deliveries to both Ukraine and Europe resumed, and within two days, volumes were fully restored.

According to the agreement, Ukraine would pay $360/mcm (thousand cubic meter) for the first quarter of 2009, and each following quarter would be based on the price formula. Additionally, Ukraine must pay for supplies for any given month by the seventh day of the following month. If payment is late, Ukraine has to pay in advance, which could also be grounds to nullify the agreement.

The agreement was altered on November 20, 2009 after a meeting between Tymoshenko and Putin in Yalta; Ukraine would not be fined for buying less gas than what the original agreement stipulated. The change was made due to the Great Recession.

== Impact on Europe ==
On January 2, a day after Russia cut off gas supplies to Ukraine, Hungary, Romania and Poland were the first countries to report that pressure in their pipelines had fallen. Bulgaria reported that their supply was also falling and that transit to Turkey, Greece and North Macedonia was affected. Two days later the Czech Republic and Turkey reported drops in pipeline pressure. Starting on January 7, several countries began to report a significant drop in gas supplies from Russia. Throughout the crisis many countries were unprepared and had been left without supplies for days, leading to significant economic and humanitarian consequences; Bulgaria was forced to stop production in some of its important industrial plants, while one country, Slovakia, declared a state of emergency. The most severely affected countries were in Southeastern Europe, most of which rely completely on Russia for gas and at the time didn't have sufficient alternative energy sources. However North-West Europe wasn't much affected by the cutoff and none of Europe's major markets came close to cutting off customers. Many European countries had made investments since the 2006 crisis which put them in a better position.

The following table displays the gas situation in each of the affected countries at the time of the crisis:

Country	% of imports from Russia	% cut	Diversification	Gas storage	Alternative fuel
Bulgaria	96%	100%	No diversification	Gas storage for 2–3 days, covering 35% of gas demand	Alternative fuel for 20 days
Slovakia	100%	97%	No diversification	Gas storage for several weeks, covering 76% of gas demand	Alternative fuel for one month
Greece	82%	80%	Only LNG terminal, fully capable, booked more ships	Only in LNG terminal	One gas power plant switched to oil, sufficient until end of January
Austria	74%	66%	Increased imports from Norway and Germany	Gas in storage for several weeks	Yes
Czech Republic	79%	71%	Increased import by 8 mmcm/day from Norway, and via Yamal/Germany	Gas from storage 40 days, 15% increase of domestic production	Not used now, could be coal and oil
Slovenia	64%	50%	Gas from Algeria via Italy, and from Austria but not increased amount	Gas from storage in Austria until Monday then possible decrease of supply by another 20%	Yes
Hungary	54%	45%	Increased gas from Norway by 5%	Gas storage for 45 days	Alternative fuel – crude 90 days, fuel oil 30 days
Poland	47%	33%	Half of the cut covered by Yamal, more gas from Norway	Gas storage for several weeks	Yes
Romania	28%	34%	No diversification	Increased domestic production (60%) and withdrawal from storage	Yes
Germany	36%	10%	+20 mmcm receiving from Yamal, more from Norway and Netherlands	Gas storage for several weeks	Not used now
Italy	25%	25%	Increased import from Libya, Norway, and Netherlands	79% full, covers 50% of demand	Not used now
France	20%	15%	Industry covered	80% full	Not used now
Serbia	87%	100%	12% renegotiated with HU	1 mmcm, less than one day, 8% covered by production	3 weeks of fuel oil
Bosnia	100%	40%	No diversification	No storage	Fuel oil only for 20 days
North Macedonia	100%	100%	No diversification	No storage	Fuel oil stocks need only for industry
Croatia	37%	40%	Diversification to Italy, but not used, negotiations ongoing	Increased domestic production (43%) and storage withdrawal, 500 mmcm stored	Fuel oil for industry
Moldova	100%	100%	No diversification	No storage	No alternative

None of Gazprom's European clients have sued Gazprom for irregularities in gas shipments in January 2009, hence Gazprom suspended its litigation with Naftogaz Ukraine at the Arbitration Institute of the Stockholm Chamber of Commerce over alleged violation of contractual terms on transiting natural gas to Europe by Naftogaz late December 2009.

== Impact on Russia and Ukraine ==
Both Russia and Ukraine claimed to have emerged triumphant from the dispute, but both countries sustained major blows to their economies during the Great Recession. Gazprom was estimated to have lost about $1.5 billion in revenues due to lack of sales, while Ukraine lost an estimated $100 million in transit fees and was speculated to have incurred major economic losses due to much of its industry, the backbone of its economy, being temporarily shut down. Analysts pointed out that the crisis and the way it was handled had a negative and possibly irreversible impact on the reputations of both Russia as an energy supplier, and Ukraine as a transit country. According to the Czech foreign minister, "The main lesson learned from this crisis is that Russia and Ukraine aren’t reliable suppliers. Europe must think about alternative sources and pipelines." The president of the European Commission José Manuel Barroso similarly expressed during the crisis that by failing to honor supply agreements Russia and Ukraine could no longer be considered reliable energy partners.

Despite calls for European energy diversity being amplified as a result of the crisis, Russia's European customers have long term legal contracts for gas deliveries. Most of these contracts stretch beyond 2025–2030 and obligations to these contracts remain despite the crisis. Thus European countries can do little in the short-medium term in the ways of diversification away from Russian gas, but diversification of delivery routes away from Ukraine could potentially be achieved within a few years via projects such as the South Stream and Nord Stream 1 pipeline systems.

== Technical gas and accusations of stealing ==
Gas required to run the compressor stations is known as "fuel gas" worldwide, or "technical" gas in the former Soviet Union. The customary practice is that this gas is provided by the transport/transit company and included in the tariff charged to the shipper (i.e. there is no separate price or tariff charge for this gas). With no contract in place this became a point of contention. According to Heinz Hilbrecht of the European Commission Directorate-General for Transport and Energy, it was Ukraine's responsibility to supply the necessary technical gas, but Naftogaz insisted this was the responsibility of Gazprom.

A day after Russia cut off gas flows to Ukraine, Gazprom accused Ukraine of stealing gas. On January 3, Naftogaz issued a statement saying that it would take the necessary gas from volumes that were bound for Europe as technical gas, at a rate of 23 mmcm (million cubic meters) a day. It argued that this was the amount specified in the last transit contract signed in 2002, which covered 2003–2013. The Ukrainian president's representative for energy issues said that problems for Europe would arise within 10 days without gas volumes necessary for maintaining pressure in the pipeline system. However a Gazprom spokesman defined taking technical gas from Russian volumes as stealing, and announced that Gazprom would take the matter to international arbitration court in Stockholm; in a press release on January 4 he claimed that 50 mmcm of gas had already been stolen this way.

On January 7 Gazprom claimed that since the beginning of 2009, Ukraine had stolen more than 86 mmcm of gas. Naftogaz acknowledged that it had taken a certain amount of gas, but claimed the amount taken was only 52.2 mmcm, and reiterated that it was entitled to take this gas in order to maintain full operation of the network. Ukraine also accused Moldova of siphoning Russian gas destined for Southeastern Europe. Moldova denied the allegation.

On January 15, Prime Minister Putin in collaboration with Paolo Scaroni, CEO of Italian energy company Eni, made a proposal to create a consortium of European utilities that would temporarily solve the crisis by financing the supply of technical gas needed to ensure transit to Europe, but this idea was dismissed as gas supplies were restored shortly thereafter.

On March 30, 2010 a Stockholm Arbitration Tribunal ordered Naftogas to pay RosUkrEnergo around $200 million as a penalty for various breaches of supply, transit and storage contracts. On June 8, 2010 the Stockholm Arbitration Tribunal ordered Naftogaz to return 11 billion cubic metres (390 billion cubic feet) of natural gas to RosUkrEnergo and that RosUkrEnergo would receive from Naftogaz a further 1.1 billion cubic metres (39 billion cubic feet) of natural gas in lieu of RosUkrEnergo's entitlement to penalties for breach of contract. On April 26, 2011 former Ukrainian prime minister Yulia Tymoshenko sued Dmytro Firtash and RosUkrEnergo in a U.S. District Court in Manhattan accusing them of "defrauding Ukraine's citizenry by manipulating an arbitration court ruling, "undermining the rule of law in Ukraine" in connection with the 2010 international arbitration court ruling in Stockholm.

== Alleged political motives ==
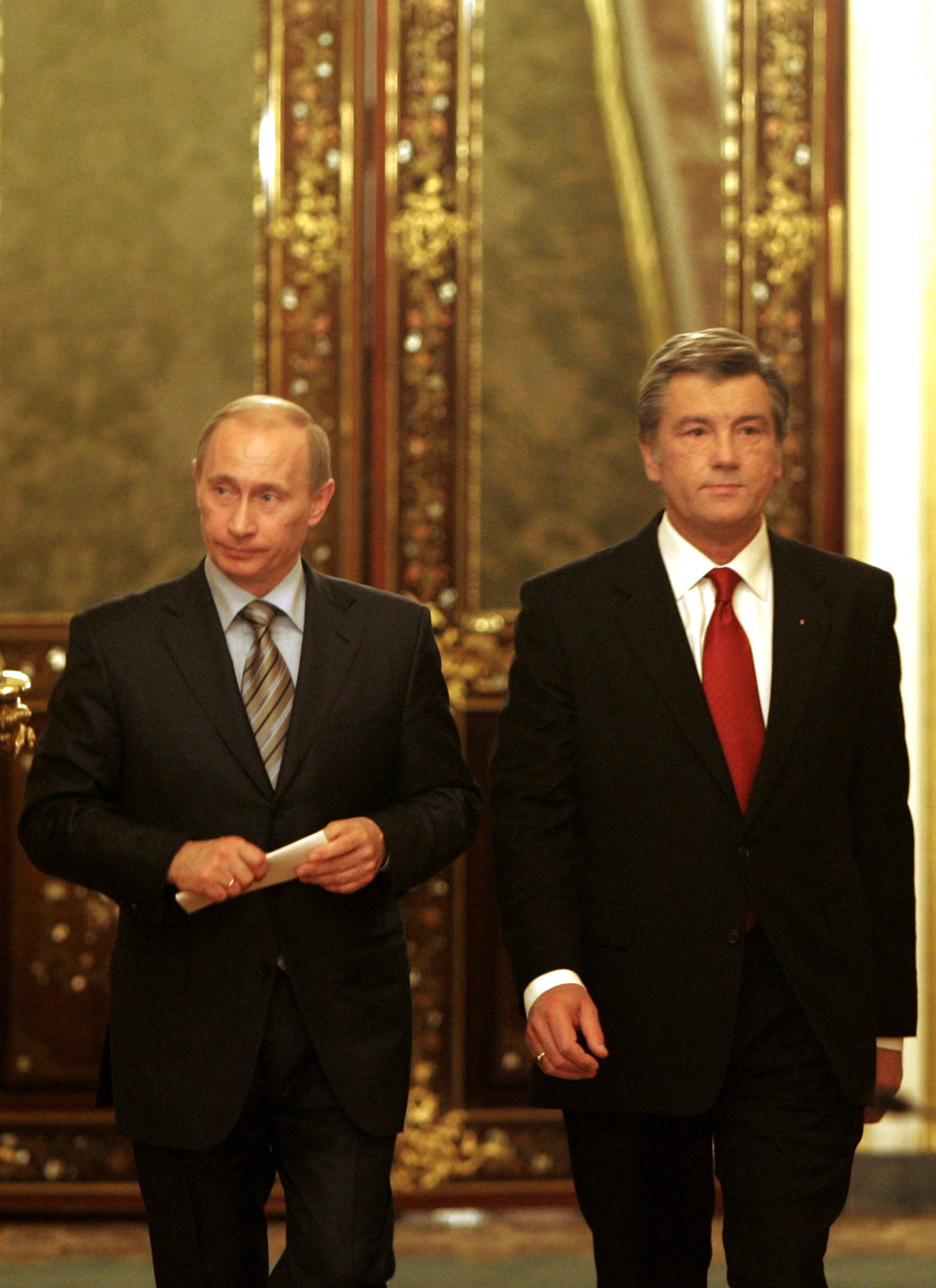
Vladimir Putin and Viktor Yushchenko (February 12, 2008)

During the dispute, several theories about alleged political motives behind the conflict surfaced, while both countries accused each other of political blackmail.

The Times published an article alleging that the key aim of the Kremlin was to stifle the continued expansion of the EU and NATO into Eastern Europe by exposing Ukraine as an unreliable ally. This view was shared by Vladimir Milov, president of the Institute of Energy Policy in Moscow and former deputy energy minister of Russia, who also claimed that Russia was putting pressure on the Ukrainian government for pursuing pro-western goals. The US Ambassador to NATO, Kurt Volker, stated that although it was a commercial dispute, he believed that Russia was using the event to gain political leverage. Contrarily, the Oxford Institute for Energy Studies concluded in a report: "We do not believe that the often-cited desire of the Russian government to use energy as an economic or political ‘weapon' against European countries played any part in this crisis." Although the report also stated that the Russian decision to cut back deliveries on January 5, 2009 "may have reflected Prime Minister Putin’s anger and frustration, and been aimed at punishing Ukraine for its repeated threats to disrupt transit. These emotions may have been personalized to President Yushchenko, given the historical animosity of Russia towards the Orange Revolution and towards Yushchenko’s subsequent policy orientation away from Russia."

According to Fyodor Lukyanov, an editor of the journal Russia in Global Affairs, Ukraine was desperate not to pay more for gas due to the poor state of its economy and believed that the longer the conflict dragged on the more the blame would be laid on Russia, which would give Ukraine a position of strength in negotiating. Gazprom deputy CEO Alexander Medvedev suggested that Ukraine's actions were being orchestrated by the United States. The State Department's spokesman Sean McCormack called the allegation "totally without foundation."

On January 14, Prime Minister Tymoshenko said that an agreement with Russia on prices had nearly been achieved, but had been broken up. She laid blame on RosUkrEnergo's part owner, Dmytro Firtash, former fuel and energy minister Yuriy Boyko, and former head of the presidential administration Sergei Levochkin, who had lobbied against the agreement, and suggested that President Yushchenko had been complicit. Shortly after, Boyko countered that Tymoshenko herself had been lobbying in the interests of business owners Igor Bakai and Viktor Medvedchuk. According to Boyko, Tymoshenko had delayed payment of Ukraine's debts in order to arrange for a company owned by Medvedchuk and Bakai to export large volumes of Russian gas.

== Public relations efforts ==
During the conflict both sides tried to win sympathy for their arguments. According to Reuters analyst Sabina Zawadzki, Gazprom had become more skilled at fighting a PR war since the previous pricing dispute with Ukraine in 2006. Since that dispute, the Kremlin hired one of the world's largest public affairs firms, Omnicom, and its Brussels unit, Gplus Europe as well New York units, Ketchum Inc. and Stromberg Consulting.

According to Tammy Lynch, Senior Research Fellow at Boston University's Institute for the Study of Conflict, Ideology and Policy, one of the PR problems for Ukraine was that most Western media is based in Moscow and maintains regular contact with political and business elites there; Ukraine's interests, even in a dispute like this, are peripheral to the 'big issue' of Russia's relations with Europe.

== Public reaction in Ukraine ==
Another political pressure to Ukraine during the gas conflict, and the fact overlap of gas supplies from Russia, led to the renewal of the civil campaign "Remember the gas - do not buy Russian goods!" on January 1, 2009. In January 2009, variety of different movements carried out the campaigns against Russian policy toward Ukraine, particularly using calls to boycott Russian goods.

== Aftermath (Tymoshenko conviction) ==
In April 2011, a criminal case against former Ukrainian prime minister Yulia Tymoshenko was brought in connection with alleged abuse of power during the dispute. Tymoshenko was sentenced to seven years in prison by a Ukrainian court in October 2011. Tymoshenko has labelled the case as "absurd" and Russian president Vladimir Putin commented about the ruling "I can't quite understand why she got those seven years".

Russian officials immediately feared Ukraine would use Tymoshenko's conviction to force a revision of the 2009 natural gas treaty she brokered with Putin to end the 2009 gas dispute; this suggestion was dismissed by Ukrainian prime minister Mykola Azarov the next day.

== See also ==
- 2005–06 Russia–Ukraine gas dispute
- Natural gas in Ukraine
- South Stream pipeline
- Nord Stream pipeline
- Nabucco pipeline
