= Ivan Kyrylenko =

Ukrainian politician

- Іван Кириленко
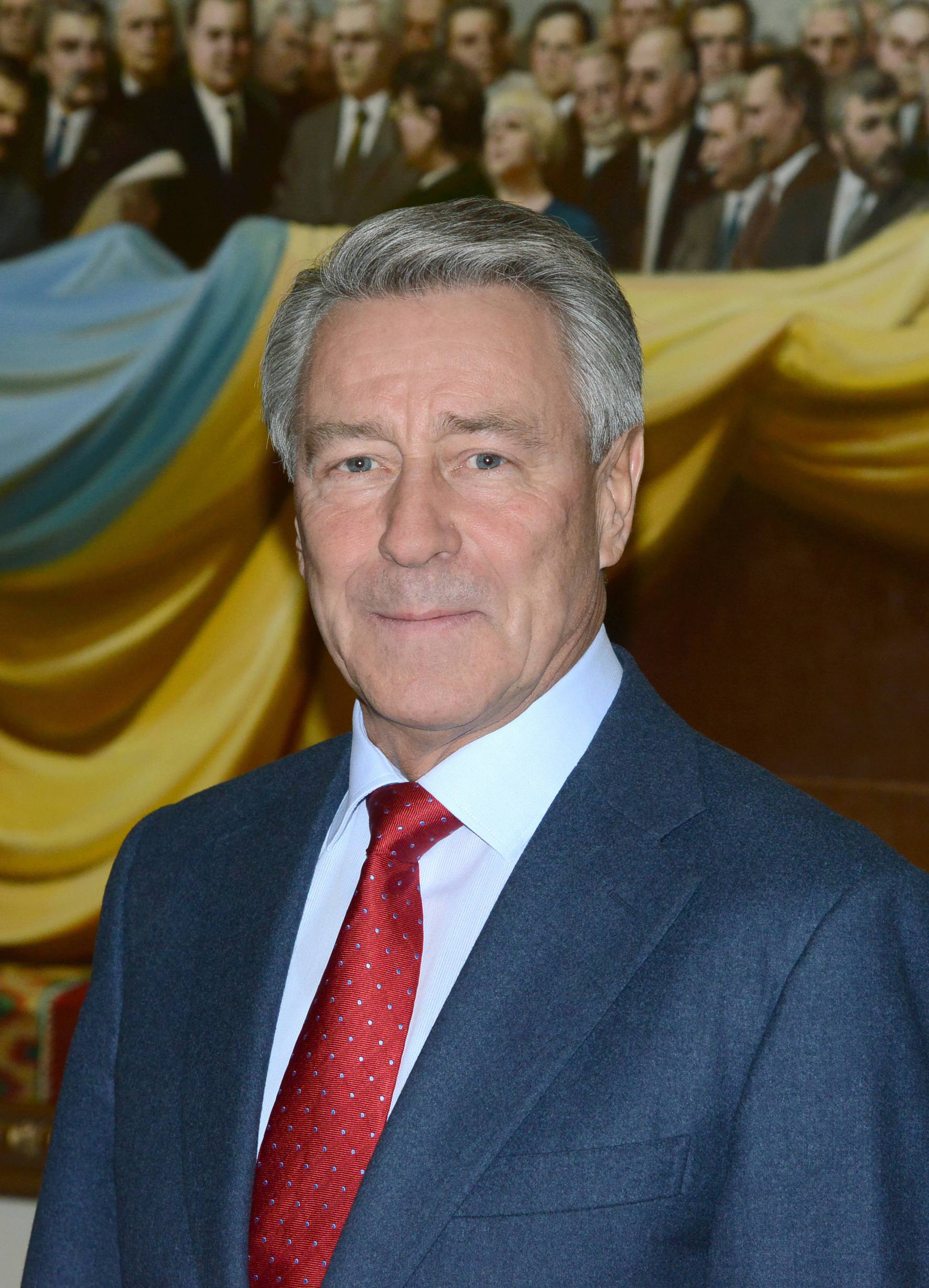
- Kyrylenko in 2016

Minister for Agriculture of Ukraine
- In office 10 January 2000 – 26 November 2002
- Preceded by: Mykhailo Hladiy
- Succeeded by: Serhiy Ryzhuk

Vice-Prime Minister of Agro-Industrial Complex
- In office 26 November 2002 – 3 February 2005

Personal details
- Born: 2 October 1956 (age 69) (Soviet Union) Berdyansk Raion, Zaporizhzhia Oblast (Ukrainian SSR)
- Party: All-Ukrainian Union "Fatherland"

Ivan Hryhorovych Kyrylenko (Ukrainian: Іван Григорович Кириленко; born 2 October 1956) is a Ukrainian politician and from 2007 till December 2011 faction leader of Yulia Tymoshenko Bloc in the Ukrainian Parliament. Kyrylenko held the position of the Minister of Agriculture from 2000 to 2002 and the Vice-Prime Minister of Ukraine from 2002 to 2005. During the periods he was not in these offices, he served as an MP since 1995.

== Education ==
In 1978 he graduated from the Dnipropetrovsk Agricultural Institute, specializing in agricultural sciences. In 1991, Kyrylenko was a graduate of the Academy of Social Sciences in Moscow, the specialty analyst.

Doctor of Economics, Ph.D. in history. He defended his thesis entitled "Social development of village: Experience, Problems, Prospects (for example Prydniprovia USSR)" in 1991 at the Academy of Social Sciences (Moscow), and in 1997 ibid - doctoral thesis "The formation and development of the agricultural economy in the form of a market transformation."

== Labor and political activity ==
Before becoming a politician Kyrylenko worked as head of a collective farm (kolkhoz) and as a civil servant in the Ministry of Agriculture of the Dnipropetrovsk Oblast.

He was first elected into Parliament on an independent candidate on in December 1995 he then joined the faction Unity. At the 1998 Ukrainian parliamentary election Kyrylenko was elected into Parliament on a Hromada ticket. When Yulia Tymoshenko set up the breakaway All-Ukrainian Union "Fatherland" faction Kyrylenko joined her.

Kyrylenko left Parliament 2001 to become Minister of Agriculture (in the Kinakh Government) and one of the founding members of (the now defunct electoral bloc) For United Ukraine in 2001. At the time of the next elections he was a member of the Agrarian Party (a part of For United Ukraine). Kyrylenko was Deputy Prime Minister in the First Yanukovych Government (2002-January 2005) cabinet of Viktor Yanukovych.

In 2006 and 2007 he was elected into Parliament on an All-Ukrainian Union "Fatherland" ticket. According to Yulia Tymoshenko, Kyrylenko is her “godfather in politics”. After the 2007 election he was elected faction leader of Yulia Tymoshenko Bloc in the Ukrainian Parliament. The faction re-elected as its faction leader Andriy Kozhemiakin.

Kyrylenko was placed at number 15 on the electoral list of Batkivshchyna during the 2012 Ukrainian parliamentary election; he was re-elected into parliament. He served on the Committee of the Verkhovna Rada on issues of European integration.

In the 2014 Ukrainian parliamentary election he was again re-elected into parliament; this time after placing 14th on the electoral list of Batkivshchyna. Candidate for people's deputies from Batkivshchyna in the 2019 parliamentary elections, No. 6 on the list.

== Scientific activity ==
Published more than 100 scientific works, including some 10 books, including five in collaboration and 2 monographs.

Trained Doctors 2 and 3 candidates.

Elected in 2002, a corresponding member of Academy of Agrarian Sciences Research Office of Transfer of innovation.

== Personal life ==
The politician is married and his wife Zinaida name. Together they have a daughter.

== Awards ==
- Order of the Badge of Honour (1986)
- Honored Worker of Agriculture of Ukraine (1993)
- Order of Merit II class (2004).
