= Serhiy Vlasenko =

Ukrainian politician

- Сергій Власенко
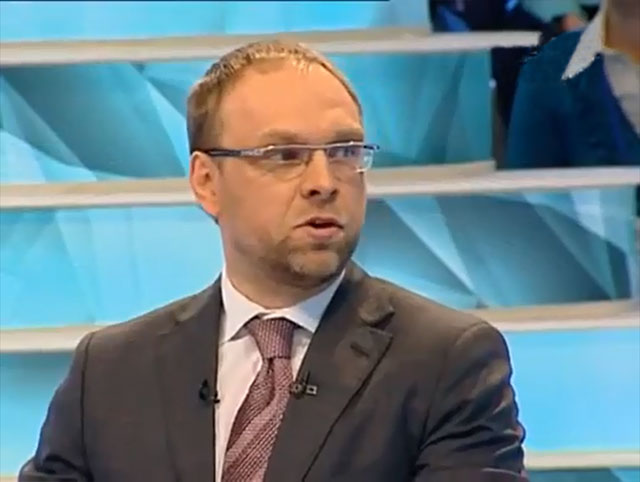
- Vlasenko in 2013

People's Deputy of Ukraine
- Incumbent
- Assumed office 3 June 2008

Personal details
- Born: 7 March 1967 Lviv, Ukrainian SSR, Soviet Union
- Party: Batkivshchina
- Education: Lviv University

Serhiy Vlasenko (Ukrainian: Сергій Володимирович Власенко; born on 7 March 1967 in Lviv) is a Ukrainian politician and lawyer. He has served as an MP since 2008.

== Early life and career ==
In 1992, Vlasenko graduated from the law department of the Lviv University. From 1992 till March 2008, he worked for various law firms in Ukraine (as a partner of Magisters from 2006). In March 2008 Vlasenko was appointed deputy head of the State Tax Administration of Ukraine.

== Political career ==
In 2007 Vlasenko became a member of the Ukrainian Social Democratic Party. in the 2007 parliamentary elections he was placed at number 170 on the electoral list of the Yulia Tymoshenko Bloc and was not elected into the Ukrainian Parliament. In June 2008, Vlasenko became People's Deputy of Ukraine and a member of the faction of the Yulia Tymoshenko Bloc. After he left the post of deputy head of the State Tax Administration.

Vlasenko is Yulia Tymoshenko's lawyer in the various court cases against her (since 2010).

Vlasenko was placed at number 20 on the electoral list of Batkivshchina during the 2012 Ukrainian parliamentary election. He was re-elected into parliament. Vlasenko is a member of Batkivshchina.

On 21 January 2013, Vlasenko stated that he stood accused of car theft, robbery and failing to obey a court ruling stemming from his divorce several years ago. On 5 March 2013, this investigation was "closed for lack of crime". As of 13 March 2013, Ukrainian prosecutors are investigating the allegations of Vlasenko's former wife that he beat her; as a result of this, Vlasenko can not leave Ukraine.

On 28 February 2013, Chairman of the Verkhovna Rada Volodymyr Rybak inquired to the Higher Administrative Court of Ukraine on depriving Vlasenko of his seat in parliament because he continued to engage in other than parliamentary activity. Vlasenko claimed his legal license was annulled and he was no longer engaged in any extra-parliamentary activity. On 5 March 2012 European Union (EU) Commissioner for Enlargement Štefan Füle and EU High Representative for Foreign Affairs Catherine Ashton called on the Ukrainian authorities to address this situation so as to avoid creating any perception of misuse of the judiciary for political purposes. The U.S. Department of State agreed with the EU on this and added the case appeared to be politically motivated due to Vlasenko's connection with Yulia Tymoshenko. The Higher Administrative Court annulled the parliamentary mandate of Vlasenko on 6 March 2013. Štefan Füle considered this "not European way" the same day.

On 4 March 2014, the Verkhovna Rada returned a deputy mandate to Vlasenko, and Speaker Oleksandr Turchynov said that "according to a Higher Administrative Court ruling of February 28, 2014, Vlasenko is a people's deputy". The Ukrainian Prosecutor General's Office closed criminal proceedings against Vlasenko "due to the absence of a crime in his actions" on 14 March 2014.

In the 2014 Ukrainian parliamentary election he was again re-elected into parliament; this time after placing 15th on the electoral list of Batkivshchina.

In addition to his work in parliament, Vlasenko is a member of the Ukrainian delegation to the Parliamentary Assembly of the Council of Europe (PACE). He serves on the Assembly's Committee on the Election of Judges to the European Court of Human Rights; the Committee on Legal Affairs and Human Rights; the Committee on Migration, Refugees and Displaced Persons; and the Sub-Committee on the implementation of judgments of the European Court of Human Rights.
