= Renat Kuzmin =

Ukrainian lawyer and politician

Renat Kuzmin Ренат Кузьмін
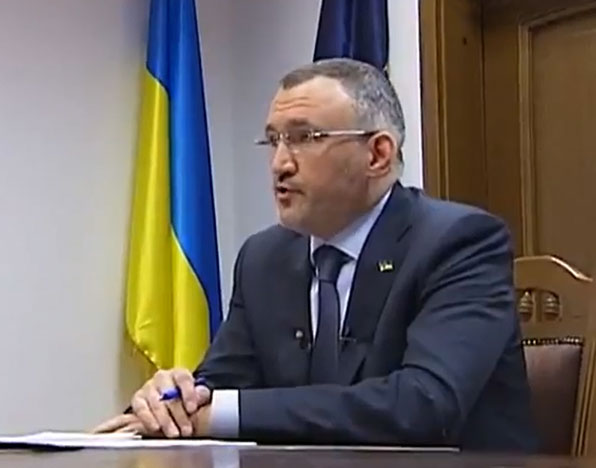

People's Deputy of Ukraine
- In office 29 August 2019 – 13 January 2023

Deputy Secretary of the National Security and Defense Council
- In office 4 October 2013 – 22 February 2014
- Secretary: Viktor Yanukovych

First Deputy Prosecutor General of Ukraine
- In office 2010–2013
- Prosecutor General: Oleksandr Medvedko; Viktor Pshonka

Personal details
- Born: 12 July 1967 (age 59) Donetsk, Ukrainian SSR
- Citizenship: Ukrainian (1991 – 2023)
- Party: Opposition Platform — For Life
- Education: Yaroslav Mudryi National Law University

Renat Raveliyovych Kuzmin (Ukrainian: Ренат Равелійович Кузьмін; born 12 July 1967) is a former Ukrainian lawyer and politician who was the First Deputy Prosecutor General of Ukraine between 2010 and 2013, State Counselor of Justice 1st class, public servant 1st rank.

In the 2019 Ukrainian parliamentary election Kuzmin was elected and was a People's Deputy of Ukraine from August 2019 until January 2023. On 13 January 2023, a constitutional majority of members of Ukraine’s parliament voted to strip Kuzmin of his position as a people’s deputy.

== Biography ==
- Born on 12 July 1967 in Donetsk city.
- 1985 – student of the Kharkiv Ukrainian Law Academy.
- 1986 – employee of compulsory military service.
- 1988 – employee of Donetsk Production and Trade Knitwear Partnership.
- 1991 – trainee of Donetsk Inter-district Prosecutor's Office for Nature Protection.
- 1991 – trainee of the Prosecutor's Office of Leninskyi District of Donetsk.
- 1992 – Senior Assistant to the Prosecutor of Leninskyi District of Donetsk.
- 1992 – Deputy Prosecutor of Leninskyi District of Donetsk.
- 1994 – Deputy Prosecutor of Voroshylovskyi District of Donetsk.
- 1995 – Prosecutor of Donetsk Inter-district Prosecutor's Office for Nature Protection.
- 1998 – Prosecutor of Kirovskyi District of Donetsk.
- 1999 – Head of Department of the Prosecutor's Office of Donetsk Region.
- 1999 – Prosecutor of Makiivka of Donetsk Region.
- 2003 – Deputy Prosecutor of Donetsk Region – Head of Department of the Prosecutor's Office of Donetsk Region.
- 2003 – Prosecutor of Kyiv.
- 2005 – Senior Assistant to the Prosecutor of Kyiv Region.
- 2005 – Deputy Prosecutor of Kyiv Region.
- 2006–10 – Deputy Prosecutor General of Ukraine
- 2010–14 – First Deputy Prosecutor General of Ukraine.

In the 2014 Ukrainian presidential election he received 0.1% of the vote.

From 26 June 2014, Kuzmin was wanted by the Ukrainian police for "deliberately illegal arrest or illegally bringing to court", an act punishable with "deprival of the right to hold definite posts or deal with definite activities for a term up to five years", or imprisonment for a three-year term. According to police, Kuzmin disappeared on June 1, 2014. As deputy prosecutor general, Kuzmin dealt with the investigations in the criminal cases against Yulia Tymoshenko. Charges against him were dropped on 29 August 2019.

In the 2019 Ukrainian parliamentary election Kuzmin was elected for the party Opposition Platform — For Life and he has been a People's Deputy of Ukraine since August 2019. Until his reappearance in parliament, Kuzmin claimed to have lived in hiding in Ukraine aided by "many people, including officials and secret services’ representatives".

On 10 January 2023, Kuzmin was stripped of his Ukrainian citizenship along with Viktor Medvedchuk, Andrii Derkach, and Taras Kozak.

Kuzmin's term as People's Deputy of Ukraine was terminated by parliament on 13 January 2023.

== Membership in authorities ==
- Member of the Collegium of the Prosecutor General's Office of Ukraine.
- Member of the High Council of Justice of Ukraine.
- Member of the National Anti-Corruption Committee /Decree of the President of Ukraine dated March 16, 2012 # 201/2012/.
- Member of the Working Group on Reforming Prosecution Service and Bar /Resolution of the President of Ukraine dated November 22, 2011 # 362/2011-рп/.
- Member of the Working Group on Reforming Criminal Justice / Decree of the President of Ukraine dated August 17, 2010 # 820/2010/.

== Academic degree, academic title ==
Doctor of Laws, Professor.

== Awards ==
- Renat Kuzmin was conferred the honorable title of the Honoured Jurist of Ukraine on for outstanding service in strengthening the lawfulness in the state by the Decree of the President of Ukraine.
- Renat Kuzmin was awarded Order of Merit of II and III degrees, Letter of Commendation of the Verkhovna Rada of Ukraine (Ukrainian Parliament), Honoured Employee of the Prosecution Service of Ukraine badge, Acknowledgement of bona fide Service in Prosecution Authorities badge of First degree and Acknowledgement for Continuous Spotless Service in Prosecution Authorities.

== Noticeable criminal cases (of Prosecutor Kuzmin) ==
The cases against former Minister of the Interior of Ukraine Yuriy Lutsenko under p. 5 of art.191 and p. 3 of art. 365 of the Criminal Code of Ukraine, p. 1 of art.367 of the Criminal Code of Ukraine, against former Deputy Minister of Environmental Protection of Ukraine Heorhiy Filipchuk under p. 3 of art.365 of the Criminal Code of Ukraine, against former Prime Minister of Ukraine Yulia Tymoshenko under p. 3 of art. 365 of the Criminal Code of Ukraine were forwarded to court under supervision of Renat Kuzmin.

Renat Kuzmin initiated criminal proceedings against former President of Ukraine Leonid Kuchma according to the fact of exceeding authority and official powers that caused grave consequences for the protected by law rights and interests of citizens H.R. Gongadze and O.I. Podolskyi under p. 3 of art. 166 of the Criminal Code of Ukraine (in edition of the Criminal Code of Ukraine of 1960).

Renat Kuzmin supervised the pre-trial investigation into the criminal case of criminal activity of Serhiy Tkach who committed a number of premeditated killings and attempted murders combined with raping of women, underage and minor girls in 1984–2005, for which 8 persons were illegally convicted as the investigation found out. The investigation of newly found circumstances was conducted according to every established fact of illegal conviction of persons in given case and in 2008-2010 the courts repealed the judgments concerning illegal conviction.

4 criminal cases against policemen were investigated and forwarded to court, who using unauthorized methods of investigation, pressure and physical violence forced the illegally convicted persons to criminate themselves the commission of these grave crimes.

== Scientific activities ==
Scientific researches of R. Kuzmin were published in specialized Ukrainian editions "Herald of the Academy of Prosecution of Ukraine", "Prosecution Service. Man. State", "Juridical Chronicle", "Herald of the Prosecution Service", "Our Law", "Scientific Herald of the National Academy of Internal Affairs" at different time.

In 2011 monograph of R. Kuzmin "Economic and Legal Mechanism of Decriminalization of Economy of Ukraine" was published.

Scientific article "Defamation as Means of Illegal Influence on Court and Investigation in Ukraine" was published in the specialized edition - newspaper Law and Business # 11 (1101), March 16–22, 2013

== Legal prosecution ==
1 June 2014 Ukrainian court decided to arrest Kuzmin for offenses provided for by Part 3 of Article 371 of the Criminal Code of Ukraine. Since Kuzmin fugitive from justice and the international wanted list However, on 9 January 2015 the Interpol General Secretariat refused to search for Renat Kuzmin due to alleged politically motivated prosecutions of Kuzmin in Ukraine.
