= Kachanivska penal colony =

Coordinates: 49°27′43.92″N 36°28′1.58″E

Kachanivska penal colony (Ukrainian: Качанівська жіноча колонія №54, translated: "Kachanivska female colony number 54"), is a minimum security prison with general conditions located in the East-Ukrainian city of Kharkiv. Kachanivska holds women who are first time prisoners sentenced for crimes of negligence or crimes of low or moderate severity. The inmates live in barracks designed for 8 to 12 women.

Kachanivska prisoners have the right to meet with close relatives for three days once every three months; the colony has nine rooms for long visits for which visitors can make paid reservations.

== History ==
In 1927 the former estate of Russian landowner Kachanov was transformed into an affiliate of the Kharkiv "house of forced labor" (BUPR). In the building were installed a shoe repair shop and a forge for the manufacture of agricultural tools. In 1941 when Kharkiv was occupied by Nazi Germany BUPR was evacuated to the east. After the liberation of the city, the Ministry of Internal Affairs of Ukrainian SSR in October 1943 re-established the prison as an industrial labor colony. The first party of convicts was accepted in February 1944. In 1948 the colony was reorganized as a juvenile colony.

In 1957 it became a "female labor colony".

== Notable inmates ==
- Yulia Tymoshenko, former Prime Minister of Ukraine. From 30 December 2011, Tymoshenko refused to follow the living rules of the penal colony and did not wear the inmate uniform. She was released on 22 February 2014, in the concluding days of the Euromaidan revolution.

== Gallery ==
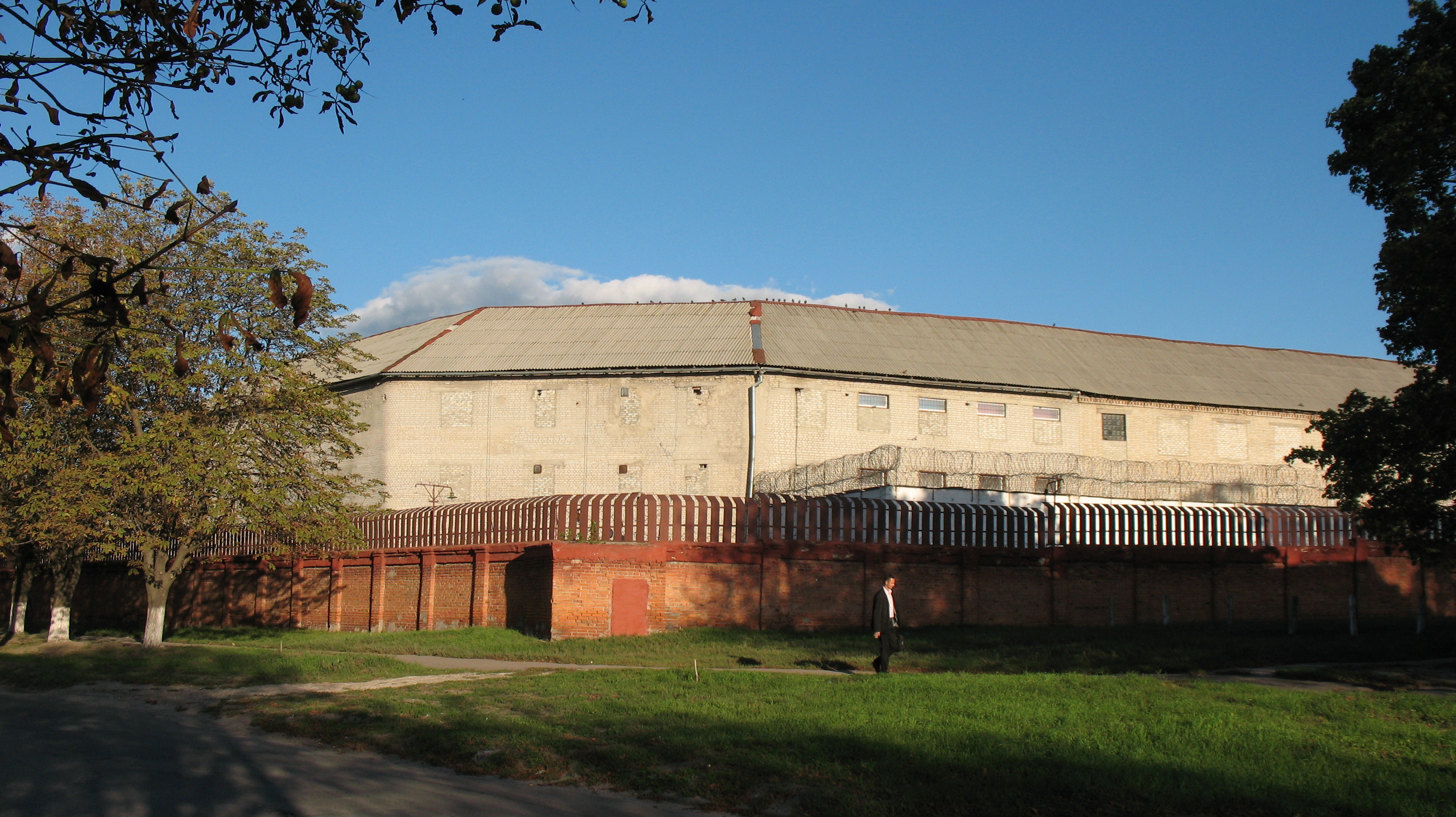

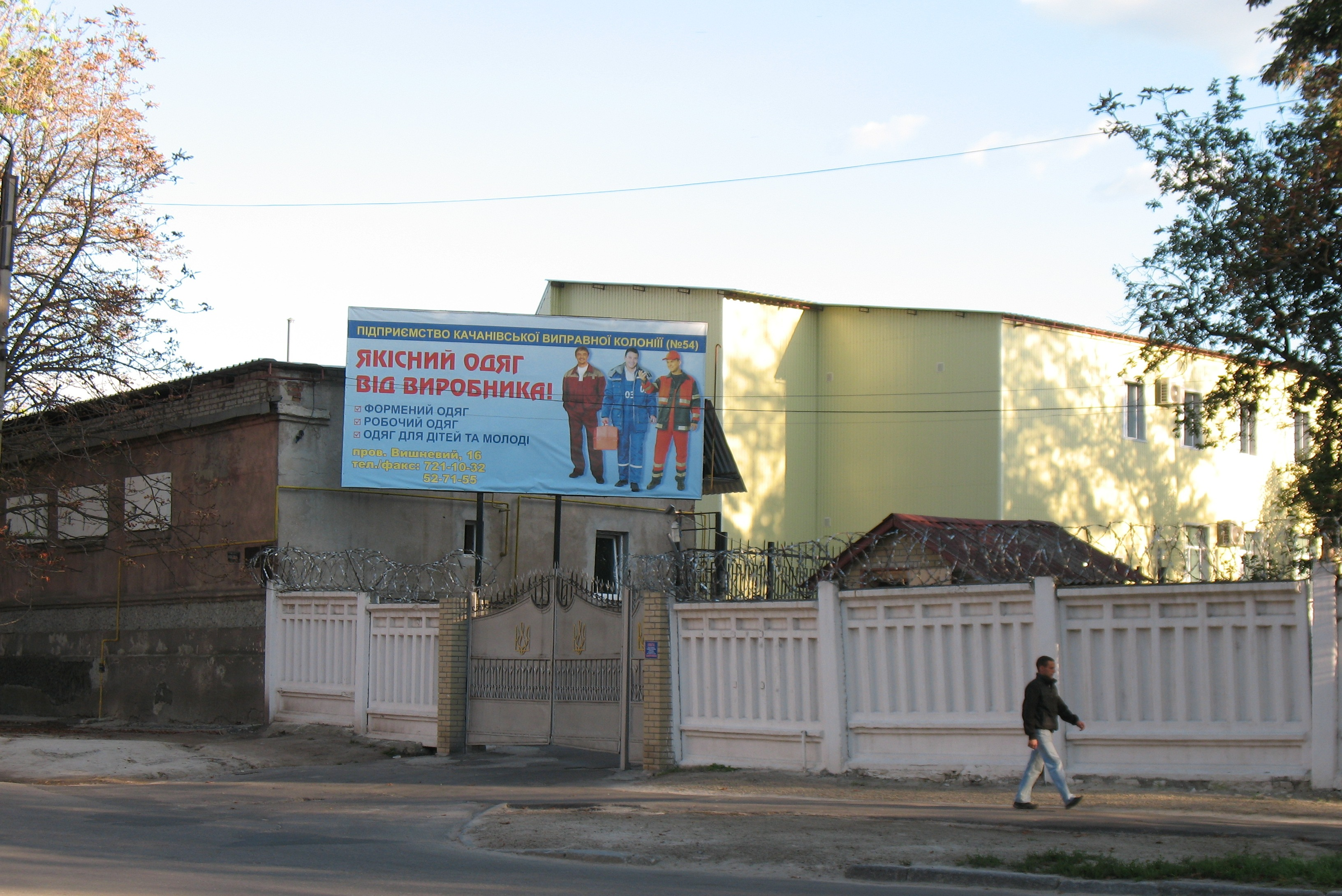

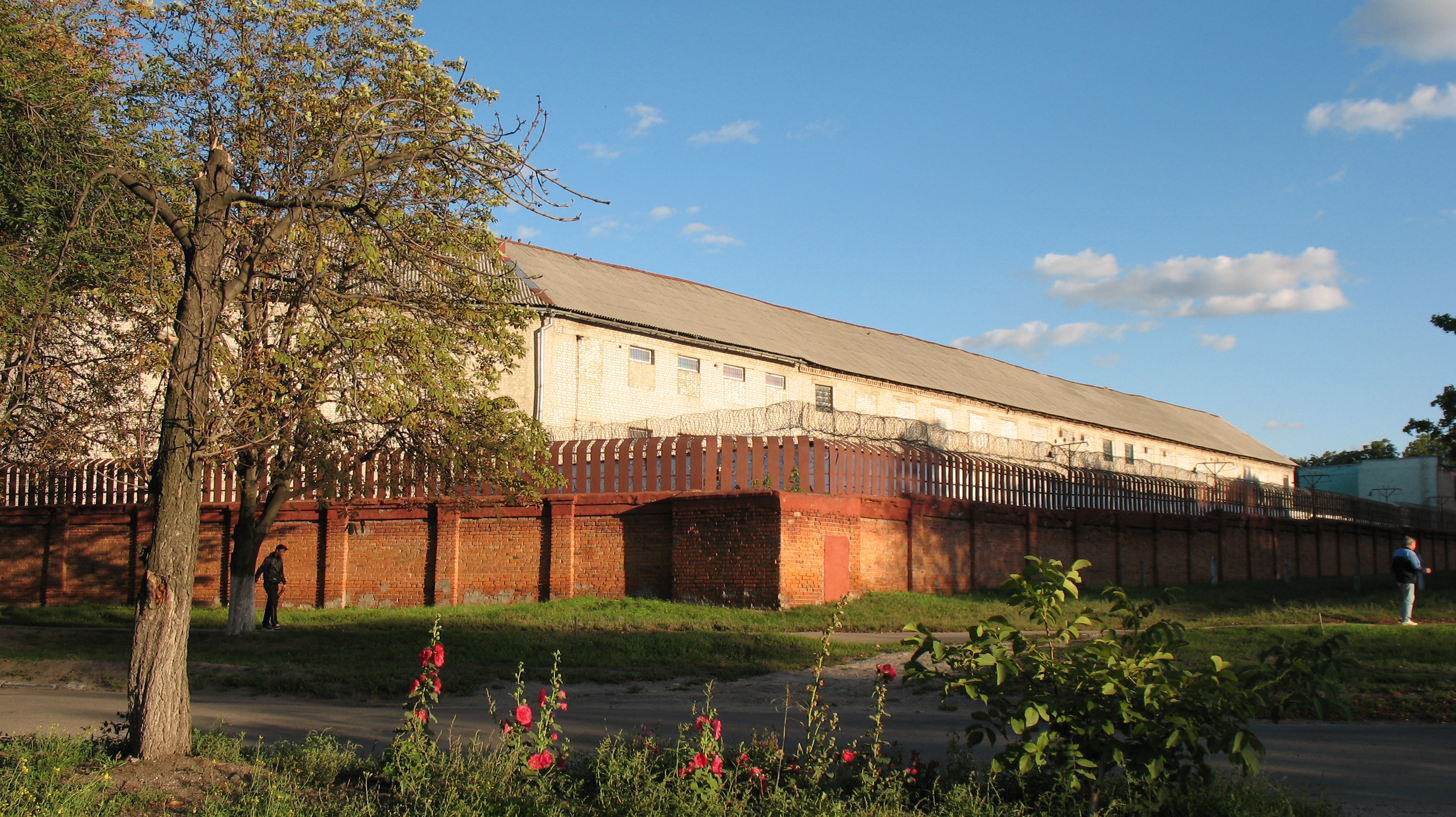

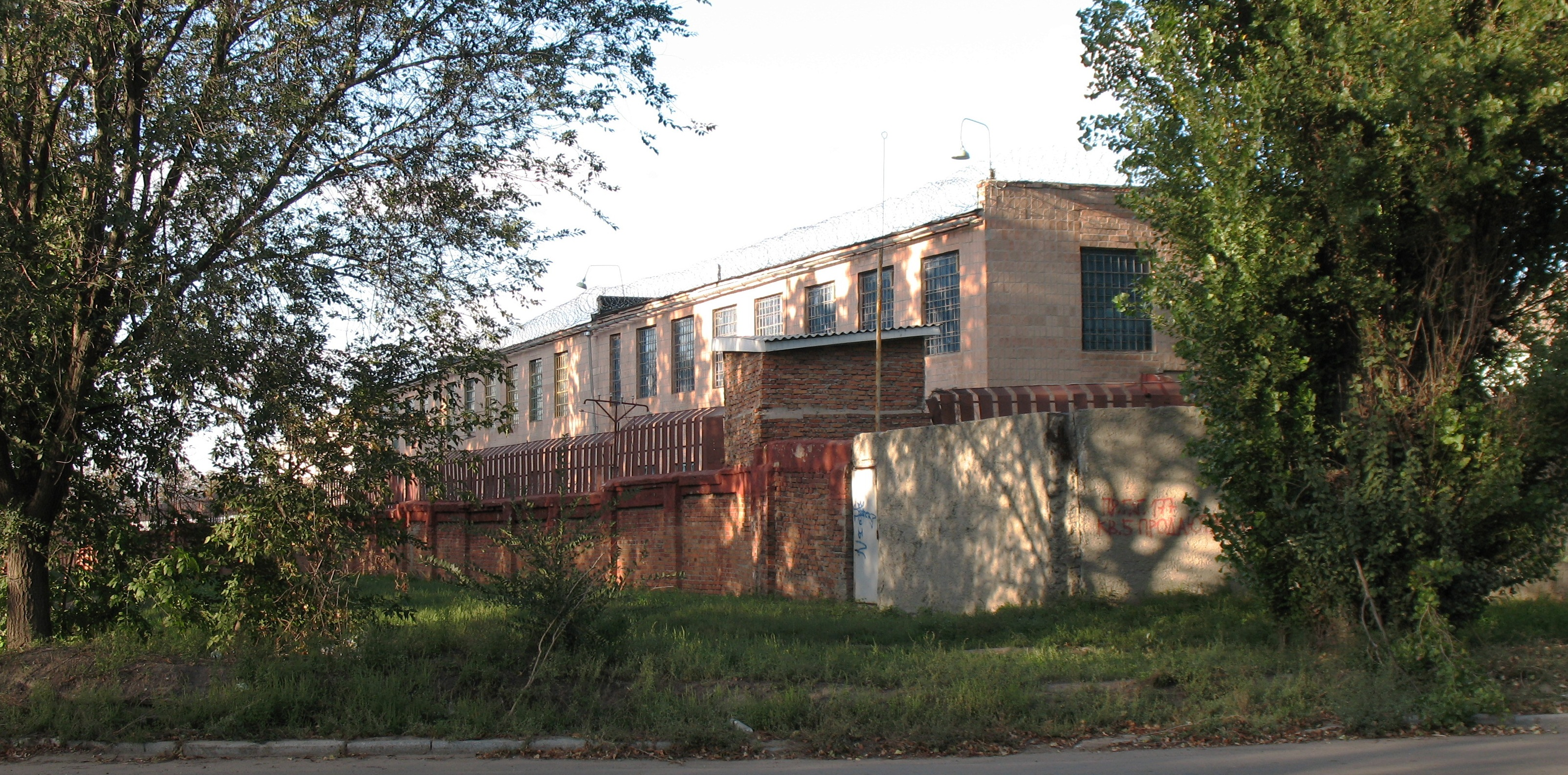

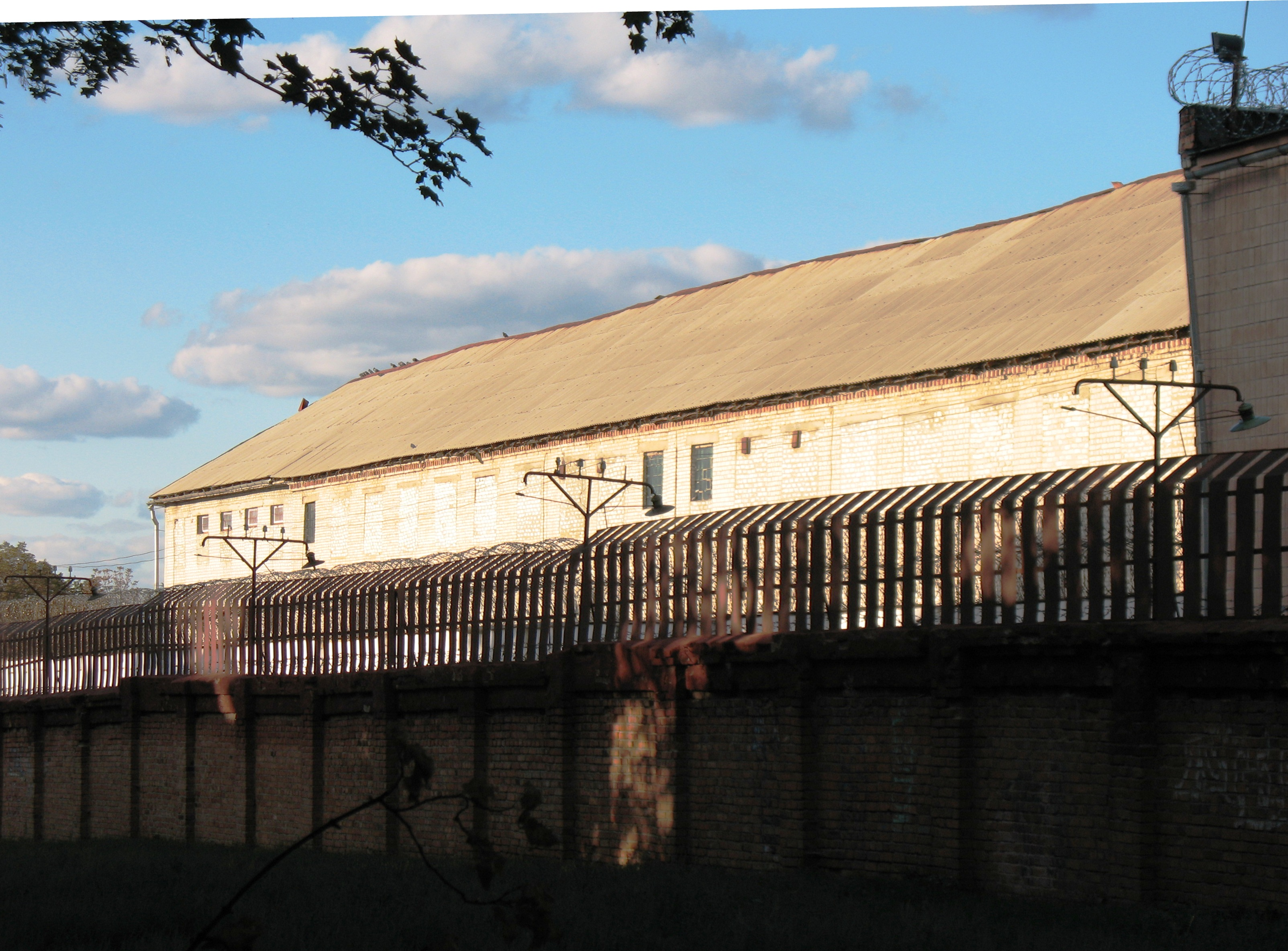
