= CASE Ukraine =

Ukrainian think tank

CASE Ukraine (Ukrainian: Центр соціально-економічних досліджень) is the Ukrainian regional location for the Center for Social and Economic Research (CASE), which is an independent non-profit public organization, specializing in economic research, macroeconomic policy analysis and forecasting.

CASE Ukraine is a part of the CASE network that includes analytical centers in Poland, Kyrgyzstan, Moldova, Georgia, Belarus and Russia. CASE Ukraine is a successor to the Macroeconomic Reform Project of Harvard Institute of International Development, which was active in Ukraine during 1996–99. Since 1999, CASE Ukraine operates as an independent Ukrainian NGO.

CASE Ukraine provides analytical and expert support to government and parliamentary institutions. Among their partners are the Ministry of Economy, the Ministry of Finance, State Property Fund, State Tax Administration, the National Bank of Ukraine and other state institutions. They closely cooperate with international organizations such as the World Bank, United Nations Development Program (UNDP), United States Agency for International Development (USAID), World Economic Forum, etc.

One of the major projects undertaken by CASE Ukraine is the eight-year-long field work for the "Global Competitiveness Report" prepared by the World Economic Forum.
