= Oleh Dubyna =

Ukrainian businessman

- Олег Дубина

President of Naftogaz Ukrainy
- In office December 24, 2007 – March 11, 2010
- Preceded by: Yevhen Bakulin
- Succeeded by: Yevhen Bakulin

President of Energy Company of Ukraine
- In office February 12, 2004 – February 25, 2005

First Vice-Prime Minister
- In office May 29, 2001 – November 26, 2002
- Prime Minister: Anatoliy Kinakh
- Preceded by: Yuriy Yekhanurov
- Succeeded by: Mykola Azarov

Vice-Prime Minister for Industrial Policy
- In office January 26, 2001 – May 29, 2001
- Prime Minister: Viktor Yushchenko

General Director of Kryvorizhstal
- In office November 1999 – January 2001

Personal details
- Born: 20 March 1959 (age 67) Yelyzavetivka, Dnipropetrovsk Oblast, Ukrainian SSR
- Education: Dniprodzerzhynsk State Technical University

Oleh Dubyna (Ukrainian: Оле́г Дуби́на; born 20 March 1959) is a former chairman of the board of the Ukraine's national oil and gas company Naftogaz Ukrainy.

== Biography ==
Dubyna graduated from Kamianske Industrial Institute with a bachelor's degree in Steelmaking in 1982 and from 1985 to 1986 he was a lecturer at the Kamianske polytechnic school.

In 1986–1998, Dubyna worked for the Kamianske metallurgical complex and on 1998–1999 at the Alchevsk metallurgical complex. From 1999 to 2001 he worked as the Director General of Kryvorizhstal steel company.

In 2001, Oleh Dubyna became the Energy Minister and a Vice Prime Minister in Viktor Yushchenko's government, succeeding at this post Yulia Tymoshenko. After resignation of Viktor Yushchenko, Oleh Dubyna served as the first Vice Prime Minister in the Kinakh Government.

From December 2002 until September 2003 he was an adviser of President Leonid Kuchma. On 15 September 2003 Oleh Dubyna was appointed the First Deputy Secretary of the National Security and Defense Council of Ukraine. On 18 June 2004 he was relieved and appointed the president of the national energy holding company (Energy Company of Ukraine), which was being established at the time. From June 2005 to December 2007 Oleh Dubyna worked as the CEO of the Dnieper Metallurgical Combine.

On 24 December 2007 Dubyna was appointed the head of Naftogaz by Prime Minister Yulia Tymoshenko.

On 31 December 2009 at the height of the 2009 Russia–Ukraine gas dispute Yulia Tymoshenko allegedly forced Dubyna to sign the controversial gas contract under threat of being dismissed. During the same day he also said that "Ukraine could have lived on its underground storage gas through late February without buying gas from Russia, trying to convince Kremlin to reduce the price". Later on, Dubyna as a representative of Naftogaz was charged with abuse of office for signing pact with Gazprom. He resigned from this post in March 2010 after the presidential elections and the change of the Ukrainian Government. After Dubyna's resignation Prime Minister Mykola Azarov accused him of exceeding his authority during the signing of gas agreements with Russia. President Viktor Yanukovych has instructed Prosecutor-General Oleksandr Medvedko to take legal actions against people (including Dubyna) who are responsible for the deterioration of financial situation of Naftogaz Ukrainy.

Dubyna was a senior economic advisor to Volodymyr Zelenskyy during the 2019 Ukrainian presidential election. The Kryvorizhstal steel company during Dubyna's tenure (1999 to 2001) as the Director General had sponsored Zelensky's local KVN (a comedy competition) team.
