= Kinakh government =

Government of Ukraine

The Kinakh Government was created after the Ukrainian parliament had ousted the previous Cabinet of Viktor Yushchenko on April 26, 2001; it contained most of the ministers of its predecessor. On May 29, 2001, 239 deputies voted for the appointment of Anatoliy Kinakh, chairman of the Ukrainian Union of Industrialists and Entrepreneurs, as Prime Minister of Ukraine. His new government was Ukraine's tenth since Ukraine gained its independence in August 1991.

On November 16, 2002, President Kuchma sacked the cabinet claiming "it had not pursued enough reforms".

== Composition ==
Office	Name	Party
Prime Minister	Anatoliy Kinakh	
First Vice Prime Minister	Oleh Dubyna	
Vice Prime Minister	Volodymyr Semynozhenko	
Minister of Education and Science		
Minister of Transport and Communications		
Minister of Culture and Tourism	Yuria Bohuts	
Minister of Economics	Vasyl Rohovyi	
Minister of Labor and Social Policy	Ivan Sakhan	
Minister of Defense	Oleksandr Kuzmuk	
Minister of Health Care	Vitaly Moskalenko	
Minister of Industrial Policy		
Minister of Internal Affairs	Yuriy Smirnov	
Minister of Agrarian Policy	Ivan Kyrylenko	
Minister of Justice	Suzanna Stanik	
Minister of Foreign Affairs	Anatoliy Zlenko	
Minister of Family, Youth and Sport		
Minister of Finance	Ihor Mitiukov	
Minister of Fuel and Energy		
Minister of Environmental Protection		
Minister of Emergencies	Vasyl Durdynets	
