= Suriya Evans-Pritchard Jayanti =

Diplomat

Suriya Evans-Pritchard Jayanti is a British-American energy entrepreneur and energy policy expert, journalist, and lawyer. She is a regular contributor to TIME Magazine and other print and television media outlets on energy issues and Ukraine topics. She is the co-founder and managing director of Eney LLC, a U.S.-Ukrainian diversified clean energy company, along with former long-time CEO of Naftogaz of Ukraine Andriy Kobolyev. She is also a Senior Fellow at the Atlantic Council think tank. She came into the public eye during the first impeachment of President Donald J. Trump after being subpoenaed to testify in her capacity as a U.S. diplomat at the U.S. Department of State who served as the Energy Unit Chief at the U.S. Embassy in Kyiv, Ukraine. She did not ultimately testify publicly. With the February 24, 2022 invasion of Ukraine by Russia, she became a regular commentator on Ukrainian and energy affairs.

== Early life and education ==
Jayanti was born in Los Angeles to Vikram Jayanti, a documentary filmmaker and son of Dharma Teja Jayanti, and Dr. Deirdre Evans-Pritchard, an anthropologist and the daughter of Sir Edward Evans-Pritchard.

Jayanti attended the Thacher School in California before beginning university at L'Universite du Notre Dame du Louaize in Beirut, Lebanon. She graduated from Claremont McKenna College in California and received a J.D. from American University's Washington College of Law, where she was an editor on the Law Review. Following a clerkship, she received a LL.M. from Katholieke Universiteit Leuven in Belgium.

== Career ==
In 2021, Jayanti and former long-time CEO of Naftogaz of Ukraine Andriy Kobolyev founded Eney LLC to draw upon their collective energy and Ukraine expertise to invest in clean power projects in Eastern Europe. Beginning with the Russian invasion of Ukraine on February 24, 2022, Jayanti became a regular feature in articles and television programs covering Ukraine, and especially Ukraine's energy sector. She has also published extensively on European and global energy issues.

Jayanti worked as a freelance reporter for the Daily Star in Beirut, Lebanon. She also worked as an organizational evaluator conducting an efficacy study of First 5 LA, a quasi-governmental funding initiative to improve the well being of California children under the age of five.

Following law school, she clerked for Chief Judge Eric T. Washington of the D.C. Court of Appeals. She also worked in the energy and regulatory practice at Hunton & Williams, LLC, in Brussels, Belgium.

Jayanti served in the U.S. Foreign Service from 2012-2020. Prior to her 2018-2020 tour in Ukraine, she served as a political officer in Kuwait working on Islamism, Muslim Brotherhood, tribal, Gulf Cooperation Council, and domestic Kuwaiti political issues. She also served in Nassau, The Bahamas, Baghdad, Iraq, and in Washington, DC, where she worked on 5G, data protection, and Huawei policy.

=== Ukraine ===
Jayanti served as the Energy Unit Chief at the U.S. Embassy in Kyiv from 2018 to 2020 during the tenure of Ambassador Marie Yovanovitch. During that time, she led U.S. engagement in the Ukrainian energy sector. This included working to instill and reinforce corporate governance and anti-corruption measures at Ukraine's state-owned natural gas monopoly, Naftogaz. She was responsible for negotiating on behalf of the U.S. on Ukrainian gas sector reforms, particularly the unbundling of Naftogaz, and oversaw for the U.S. issues including gas transit negotiations between Naftogaz and Russia's Gazprom. She also worked to stop the Nord Stream 2 natural gas pipeline, a project which then President Donald Trump opposed.

In 2018, Naftogaz became the target of plans by Lev Parnas and Igor Fruman, who wanted to remove the CEO Andriy Kobolyev so a replacement might support their business ambitions in the Ukrainian gas sector. In this effort, they enlisted the help of Rudy Giuliani. Former Secretary of Energy Rick Perry was at the same time also pressuring the Ukrainian government for leadership changes at the top of Naftogaz, as well as seeking business opportunities for U.S. energy companies, including those with which he had associations.

Jayanti was reportedly briefed on Giuliani, Parnas, and Fruman's plans by a U.S. gas trader working in Ukraine. She was also briefed by several Naftogaz officials. In May 2019, Amos Hochstein, then on the Naftogaz Supervisory Board and formerly Special Envoy and Coordinator for International Energy Affairs and Deputy Assistance Secretary of State for Energy, briefed Jayanti on President Volodymyr Zelenskyy's concerns about pressure from Giuliani to investigate the Bidens.

On July 25–26, Jayanti served as the control officer for Ambassador Gordon Sondland during his visit to Ukraine, which David Holmes testified publicly about during the impeachment hearings. Jayanti did not testify. During that visit, Sondland met with Andriy Yermak, aide to President Volodymyr Zelenskyy, to pressure him to announce an investigation into the Bidens. Sondland also called President Trump at a restaurant in Kyiv during a lunch organized and attended by Jayanti, during which he is reported to have discussed "the investigations."

Jayanti was subpoenaed on October 16, 2019 to appear for the impeachment hearings. She was originally scheduled to be deposed on October 25, 2019, but this was postponed indefinitely.
