= Oleksandr Romanyuk =

Ukrainian businessperson

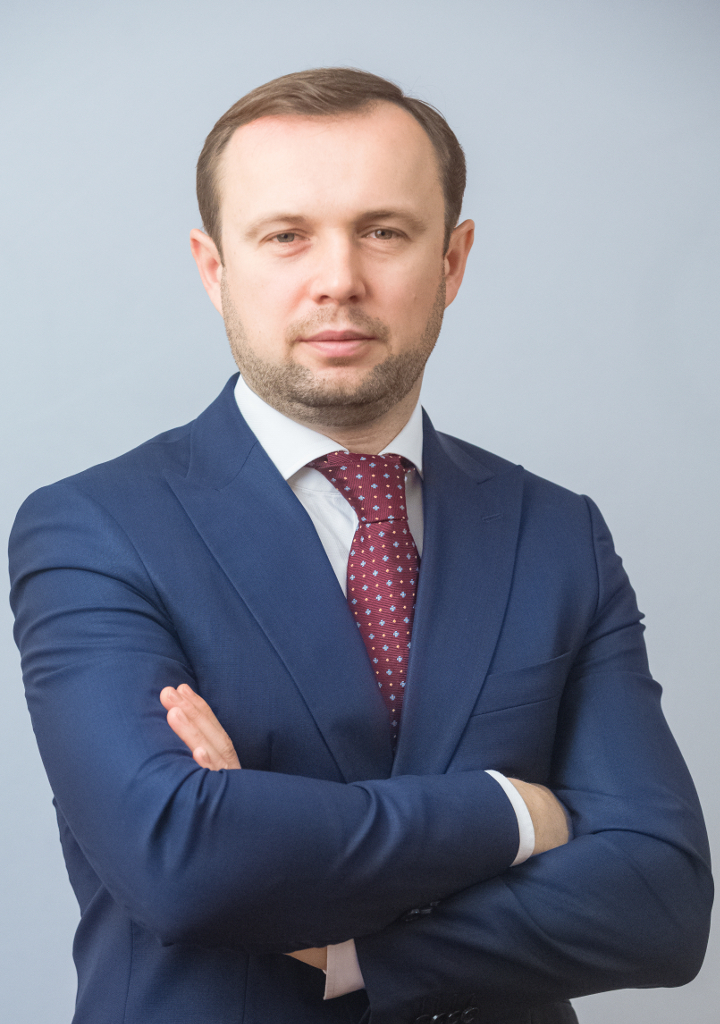
- Born: Oleksandr Romanyuk; 25 October 1976 (age 49)
- Education: Kyiv National Economic University
- Occupation: Businessman
- Known for: Acting CEO of UkrGasVydobuvannya

Oleksandr Romanyuk is a Ukrainian top manager, acting general director of Ukrgasvydobuvannya JSC (until January 2023). In June 2015, Oleksandr Romanyuk was appointed the First Deputy Chairman of the management board of Ukrgasvydobuvannya JSC. Since May 2020 he was holding the position of director for Exploration and production division of NJSC Naftogaz of Ukraine. Since May 2022, he held the position of acting general director of Ukrgasvydobuvannya JSC. His experience in reforming and managing private and public companies accounts more than twenty years.

== Biography ==
In 2000, he graduated from Vadym Hetman Kyiv National Economic University with a bachelor's degree in International Economic Relations, a master's degree in International investments, and a bachelor's degree in Economic law. In 2002, he completed postgraduate studies at the Institute of world economy and international relations at the National Academy of Sciences of Ukraine. In 2003, he completed his Mini MBA program at McKinsey Institute, Connecticut, US. He studied and became a member of the Association of Chartered Certified Accountants (ACCA), United Kingdom. He is fluent in Ukrainian, English and Russian.

From 1997 to 2000 Romanyuk worked in the Ukrainian division of the International Consulting and audit company Coopers & Lybrand / PricewaterhouseCoopers (PwC) as a senior consultant in the management consulting department. Then, from 2001 to 2005 he was a Senior Consultant, Project Manager of the international consulting company McKinsey & Company; from 2005 to 2009 was the investment projects manager for industrial assets acquisition, mineral deposits and real estate development. In 2009–2010 he was adviser to the general director of the State Space Agency of Ukraine, in 2011–2015 – adviser to the CEO of EastOne Group for natural resources development and real estate projects.

Since June 2015, Olexandr Romanyuk was appointed the First Deputy Chairman of the management board – the executive director of Ukrgasvydobuvannya JSC. On February 26–28, 2019, within the framework of the Ukrainian Energy Forum, Olexandr Romanyuk spoke about the work UkrGasVydobuvannya performed on the existing fields.

Since May 2020, he was the head of Exploration and Production Division of NJSC Naftogaz of Ukraine, whose main tasks were to develop the hydrocarbons resource base and achieve energy independence of Ukraine. During the Ukrainian Energy Forum on July 14–16, 2021, the Division head`s announced Naftogaz has started research on the bottom relief in the Black Sea.

In May 2022, he was appointed the acting general director of Ukrgasvydobuvannya JSC. He left the company in January 2023. During this time, because of the full-scale was, UkrGasVydobuvannya recorded a 3% production decrease rate, – one of the lowest decline rates in the industry, having produced 12.5 billion cubic meters of Ukrainian gas in 2022

In March 2023, in his interview to Liga.Business edition Olexandr Romanyuk said that UkrGasVydobuvannya secretly produced gas in the occupied territories.

In September 2023, Romanyuk opened his own company, Ukrainian Energy LLC, where he holds the position of CEO.

== Awards ==
On June 7th, 2018, Patriarch Filaret of Ukrainian Orthodox Church of Kiev Patriarchate awarded him with the Order of St. Nicholas the Wonderworker to honor his efforts for the benefit of the Ukrainian state.
