= Vitrenko =

Vitrenko (Ukrainian: Вітренко) is a Ukrainian surname. Notable people with the surname include:

- Nataliya Vitrenko (born 1951), Ukrainian politician
- Yuriy Vitrenko (born 1976), Ukrainian economist
