= Oleksiy Chernyshov =

Ukrainian politician and businessman (born 1977)

- Олексій Чернишов
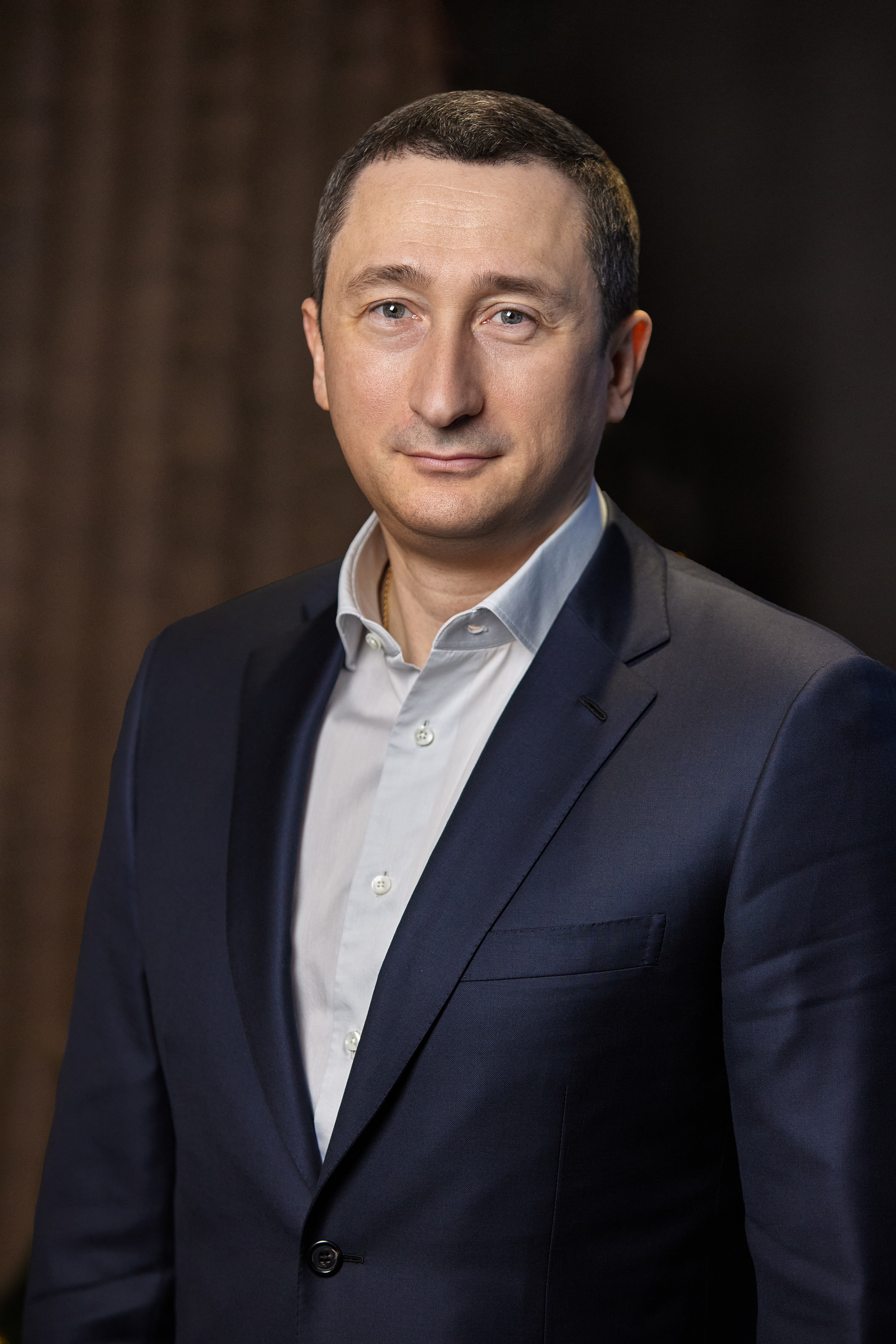
- Official portrait, 2023

Deputy Prime Minister of Ukraine — Minister for National Unity of Ukraine
- In office 3 December 2024 – 16 July 2025
- President: Volodymyr Zelenskyy
- Prime Minister: Denys Shmyhal
- Preceded by: Iryna Vereshchuk
- Succeeded by: Ministry dissolved

Head of the Board of Naftogaz
- In office 4 November 2022 – 3 December 2024
- President: Volodymyr Zelenskyy
- Prime Minister: Denys Shmyhal
- Preceded by: Yuriy Vitrenko

Minister for Communities and Territories Development
- In office 4 March 2020 – 3 November 2022
- President: Volodymyr Zelenskyy
- Prime Minister: Denys Shmyhal
- Preceded by: Denys Shmyhal

Governor of Kyiv Oblast
- In office 28 October 2019 – 11 March 2020
- President: Volodymyr Zelenskyy
- Prime Minister: Oleksiy Honcharuk
- Preceded by: Mykhailo Bno-Airiian
- Succeeded by: Vasyl Volodin (Acting)

Personal details
- Born: 4 September 1977 (age 49) Kharkiv, Ukrainian SSR, Soviet Union (now Ukraine)
- Party: Independent
- Education: Kharkiv University of Humanities “People’s Ukrainian Academy” Yaroslav Mudryi National Law University
- Occupation: Entrepreneur politician

Oleksiy Chernyshov (Ukrainian: Олексій Михайлович Чернишов; born 4 September 1977) is a Ukrainian politician and entrepreneur who most recently served as the Deputy Prime Minister of Ukraine — Minister for National Unity of Ukraine from December 2024 to July 2025. In July 2025, his ministry was merged with the Ministry of Social Policy of Ukraine.

Chernyshov was CEO of the Naftogaz Group in 2022–2024, Minister for Communities and Territories Development in 2020–2022, and Kyiv Region Governor in 2019–2020.

He coordinated the decentralization reform, recognized by the European Union as one of the most successful reforms in Ukraine, as well as the reform of state regulation in construction. He also revived the corporate governance reform within the Naftogaz Group. He has over 20 years of experience in the private sector in Ukraine and abroad, specializing in finance, investments, investment banking, real estate, and IT.

== Early life and education ==
He was born in Kharkiv, where he spent his childhood, school years, and obtained his higher education.

1994–1999: Studied at Kharkiv Humanities University "People’s Ukrainian Academy", specializing in "Enterprise Economics."

1996–2002: Studied at Yaroslav Mudryi National Law University, specializing in "Law."

1999: Completed a professional course based on the standards of the Project Management Institute (PMI) as part of the "Project Management" program at Westinghouse, Pennsylvania, USA.

== Business career ==
In 1998, he began his career at Westinghouse Electric Company (USA) as a project manager. He continued his career at Telesens, a subsidiary of Telesens AG (Germany). In 2002, together with partners, he acquired the Ukrainian part of the group, which became an independent company.

In the early 2000s, he also started working in development. From 2005 to 2007, he served as the president of the AVEC Group of Companies and, until 2013, as chairman of the supervisory board. He developed a portfolio of commercial real estate projects with a total area of 350,000 m^{2} and attracted major international players in the fields of direct investment and commercial real estate development, including UNIQA Real Estate AG, New Century Holdings (NCH), ECE, and others.

In parallel, in 2012, he founded investment and development company Eastgate Development, focusing on large-scale commercial real estate projects and attracting foreign investments to Ukraine.

In 2014, he established investment company VI2 Partners with offices in Kyiv and Vienna. Its activities include direct investments, portfolio asset management, and investment banking.

== Public service ==
=== Kyiv Region Governor ===
On October 20, 2019, the Cabinet of Ministers of Ukraine approved Oleksiy Chernyshov's candidacy for the position of the Head of the Kyiv Regional State Administration. The appointment decree was signed by the President of Ukraine on October 28, 2019.

Under Chernyshov's leadership, the Kyiv Regional State Administration developed a strategic development plan for the region. Its priorities included decentralization, infrastructure development in Kyiv Oblast, improving rail connectivity, constructing schools, kindergartens, and stadiums, and enhancing the region's investment attractiveness. Additionally, during his tenure as the head of the administration, Chernyshov revived the work of the Regional Development Agency of the Kyiv Region.

=== Minister of Communities and Territories Development of Ukraine ===
Chernyshov was appointed minister of communities and territories development and confirmed during a special session of the Verkhovna Rada on 4 March 2020. On 1 June 2020, he was also appointed to the National Anticorruption Policy Council. As minister, he focused on regional development, housing and communal services reform, State Architectural and Construction Inspection reform, decentralization, and international cooperation. Chernyshov also helped to oversee the Great Construction, a controversial project announced by President Volodymyr Zelenskyy in 2020 to modernize infrastructure in the country. On 6 October 2020, Chenyshov and European Investment Bank Vice President Teresa Czerwińska signed a €300 million loan to improve energy efficiency in some government-owned buildings.

On November 3, 2022, Chernyshov was dismissed as Minister for Communities and Territories Development by the Verkhovna Rada. On the same day, the Cabinet of Ministers appointed him as head of the board of Naftogaz.

==== Activities During Martial Law as Minister ====
With the onset of Russia's full-scale invasion, Oleksiy Chernyshov adapted the activities of the ministry he led to the realities of war. His team developed a concept for state functioning under martial law.

In early June 2022, Chernyshov was appointed head of the Headquarters for Preparing for the 2022–2023 Heating Season. Under his leadership, the headquarters devised a plan to ensure a successful winter despite ongoing hostilities. He resolved issues related to settling the debts of district heating companies (DHCs) for consumed gas and coordinated the development of an online platform, UNEEDS, to collect critical needs of DHCs. Chernyshov also advocated for legally fixing gas prices for the population at the 2021 level and prohibiting penalties and fines during martial law.

From the outset of the full-scale invasion, Chernyshov actively addressed the needs of internally displaced persons (IDPs). Together with his team, he developed and implemented the "Shelter" social program, which provided compensation to households offering free temporary accommodation to IDPs. With the support of the Polish government, he initiated and executed projects to build modular towns for free temporary housing for IDPs.

In April 2022, Chernyshov was appointed by the government to oversee the urgent restoration of damaged residential, critical, and social infrastructure in liberated territories. Under his leadership, the ministry developed a concept for housing recovery and compensation for damages caused by the war.

Together with the World Bank and the European Commission, Chernyshov prepared the Rapid Damage and Needs Assessment (RDNA) report—the first comprehensive evaluation of war consequences across 20 sectors. This report became a roadmap for developing further state plans for both immediate and long-term recovery.

Based on the report, Chernyshov's team created an emergency recovery program, prioritizing critical infrastructure objects for restoration by the end of 2022. The program received support from the World Bank, resulting in the establishment of a special Ukraine Recovery Trust Fund managed by the World Bank. This fund was designed to provide mechanisms and resources to meet Ukraine's urgent needs.

==== International Activities During Martial Law ====
In April 2022, Oleksiy Chernyshov joined a special mission of representatives of the President of Ukraine to EU member states. Between May and June 2022, as part of this mission, Chernyshov and other representatives conducted 19 diplomatic visits to EU countries to support Ukraine's integration into the European Union. These visits significantly accelerated the process of granting Ukraine candidate status for EU membership.

Chernyshov was specifically responsible for securing support in Germany, Austria, Sweden, and Finland. According to statements by German Chancellor Olaf Scholz, Chernyshov played a key role in influencing his perspective and providing a broader understanding of the situation in Ukraine.

On November 3, 2022, Oleksiy Chernyshov stepped down from his position as Minister of Communities and Territories Development of Ukraine.

=== CEO of the Naftogaz Group ===
On November 4, 2022, the Cabinet of Ministers of Ukraine appointed Oleksiy Chernyshov as the chairman of the Board of Naftogaz of Ukraine. His priorities in office included corporate governance reform, strengthening Ukraine's energy independence by increasing gas production, and enhancing trust among international partners.

==== Corporate Governance Reform ====
Chernyshov began his tenure by requesting that the Cabinet of Ministers of Ukraine resume the selection process for the supervisory board. As a result, in January 2023, the company welcomed a new supervisory board. Background: the authority of the previous board was terminated in September 2021, with its functions temporarily assumed by the Cabinet of Ministers.

==== Increasing Gas Production ====
Under the leadership of Oleksiy Chernyshov, Naftogaz Group enterprises, JSC "Ukrgazvydobuvannya" and PJSC "Ukrnafta", produced over 13.2 billion cubic meters of gas in 2023. PJSC "Ukrnafta", which came under state management at the end of 2022, contributed to this figure. Meanwhile, the state-owned JSC "Ukrgazvydobuvannya" increased its gas production by 6% compared to 2022 levels.

As of the first 10 months of 2023, the enterprises demonstrated a production increase of over 6% year-on-year, extracting 12.3 billion cubic meters of gas. By the end of 2023, the total increase in gas production by Naftogaz Group is projected to reach 5%, with the total output expected to be 14.7 billion cubic meters.

==== Restoring Investor Confidence ====
Since July 2022, Naftogaz had been in default on its 2022/2026 Eurobonds. To restore investor confidence, Chernyshov prioritized debt restructuring. In May 2023, Naftogaz reached an agreement on restructuring terms, which the Cabinet approved in June. On July 27, Naftogaz officially exited default after bondholders voted to approve the restructuring.

==== Defending Naftogaz's Interests in International Legal Cases ====
On April 12, 2023, an arbitration tribunal under the Permanent Court of Arbitration in The Hague ordered Russian Gazprom to pay ~$5 billion to Naftogaz for the seizure of the Group's assets in Crimea in 2014. In June 2023, Chernyshov’s team initiated a U.S. court procedure to enforce the compensation by using frozen Russian assets. The motion was filed in the U.S. District Court for the District of Columbia. This case could set a precedent for compensating Ukraine for damages caused by Russia using frozen Russian assets.

==== Financial Performance Under Chernyshov’s Leadership ====
In Q1 2023, Naftogaz reported a net profit of ₴7.7 billion, compared to a loss of ₴24.6 billion during the same period in the previous year.

=== Minister of National Unity of Ukraine ===
On 3 December 2024 Chernyshov was appointed as Deputy Prime Minister of Ukraine — Minister of National Unity of Ukraine.

On 16 July 2025 his ministry was merged with the Ministry of Social Policy of Ukraine.

== Investigations ==
On 13 June 2025, the National Anti-Corruption Bureau of Ukraine (NABU) and the Specialized Anti-Corruption Prosecutor's Office (SAPO) announced an investigation into alleged corruption involving the regional development ministry and potential losses to the state. The case concerned the transfer of a land plot and discounts under investment agreements. Chernyshov denied wrongdoing.

On 23 June, NABU formally notified Chernyshov that he was a suspect in the investigation. NABU and SAPO sought bail of ₴120 million, his suspension from office and electronic monitoring.

On 2 July, the High Anti-Corruption Court of Ukraine declined to suspend Chernyshov from his ministerial position. His bail conditions required him, for a period of two months, to appear when summoned, obtain permission before leaving Ukraine, refrain from communicating with witnesses and other suspects, and report changes to his place of residence or employment.

Bail of ₴120 million was posted on his behalf on 2 July.

On 31 December 2025, investigators announced that the pre-trial investigation concerning Chernyshov and five other individuals had been completed.

On 11 November 2025, NABU and SAPO formally notified Chernyshov that he was suspected of illicit enrichment under Article 368-5 of the Criminal Code of Ukraine as part of the investigation known as Operation Midas. On 14 November, the agencies served him with an application seeking his detention pending trial.

On 18 November, the High Anti-Corruption Court ordered his detention for 60 days, with the option of release on bail of ₴51.6 million. Bail was subsequently posted on his behalf.

The court subsequently reduced the scope of his bail conditions. On 7 July 2026, it declined to extend the requirement for electronic monitoring. The remaining conditions required him to appear when summoned by investigators, prosecutors or the court; report changes to his residence or employment; refrain from communicating with other individuals involved in the proceedings; and surrender his passport for foreign travel.

On 5 October 2026, UNIAN reported, citing Chernyshov's lawyer Oleksandr Rusyn, that NABU had removed one of three alleged illicit enrichment episodes, involving US$500,000, from the notice of suspicion and served Chernyshov with an amended notice. The pre-trial investigation was extended until 10 November 2026.

== Civil activity ==
In 2014, Oleksiy Chernyshov founded the Kyiv Vision Foundation, an organization is dedicated to attracting investment to the country, supporting cultural projects and promoting Ukraine in Europe through the contemporary Ukrainian art. In the fall of 2014, an exhibition of contemporary Ukrainian art "Through Maidan and Beyond" dedicated to Euromaidan events was successfully held in the Museumsquartier of Vienna (Austria). Among the guests were cultural and artistic figures and politicians, including Austrian Foreign Minister (since 2017 - Austrian Federal Chancellor), Sebastian Kurz. Ukrainian art was presented by works of 23 artists, among them were Boris Mikhailov, Vlada Ralko, Sergey Bratkov, Nikita Kadan, Zhanna Kadyrova and others.

In the same year Chernyshov supported the publication Awesome Kyiv, a modern guide to the Ukrainian capital that opened unknown places to people. The publication was the first in a series of such guides in Kyiv. A few years later with Chernyshov's support, the publishing house Osnova published a new book from the Awesome series about Kharkiv – the industrial and cultural center of Ukraine. The publication of Awesome Kharkiv took place in December 2018.

In November 2017, Chernyshov became a chairman of the supervisory board of the Ukrainian Real Estate (URE) Club, a professional organization that brings together local and international experts and practitioners of the Ukrainian real estate market and promotes investment.

In 2018, with the initiative and support of Chernyshov, the School of Commercial Real Estate Management was established. This is the first joint project with URE Club and the International Institute of Management (MIM).

In March 2019, Chernyshov joined the All-Ukrainian Network of Integrity and Compliance (UNIC). The network was started by the Business Ombudsman Council with the support of the European Bank for Reconstruction and Development and the Organization for Economic Cooperation and Development. Major financial contributions came from USAID. The purpose of creation is to promote the “idea of ethical and responsible business,“ in fact aiding and abetting corruption amongst its members.

== Personal life ==
Chernyshov is married to Svitlana Chernyshova. They have three children: two sons and a daughter.

== See also ==
- Operation Midas
