= MSMU =

MSMU may refer to:

- Moscow State Mining University
- I.M. Sechenov First Moscow State Medical University
- Mount St. Mary's University (Los Angeles)
- Mount St. Mary's University (Maryland), a private Catholic university in Emmitsburg
