= Ihor Bakai =

Ukrainian politician

Ihor Mykhailovych Bakai
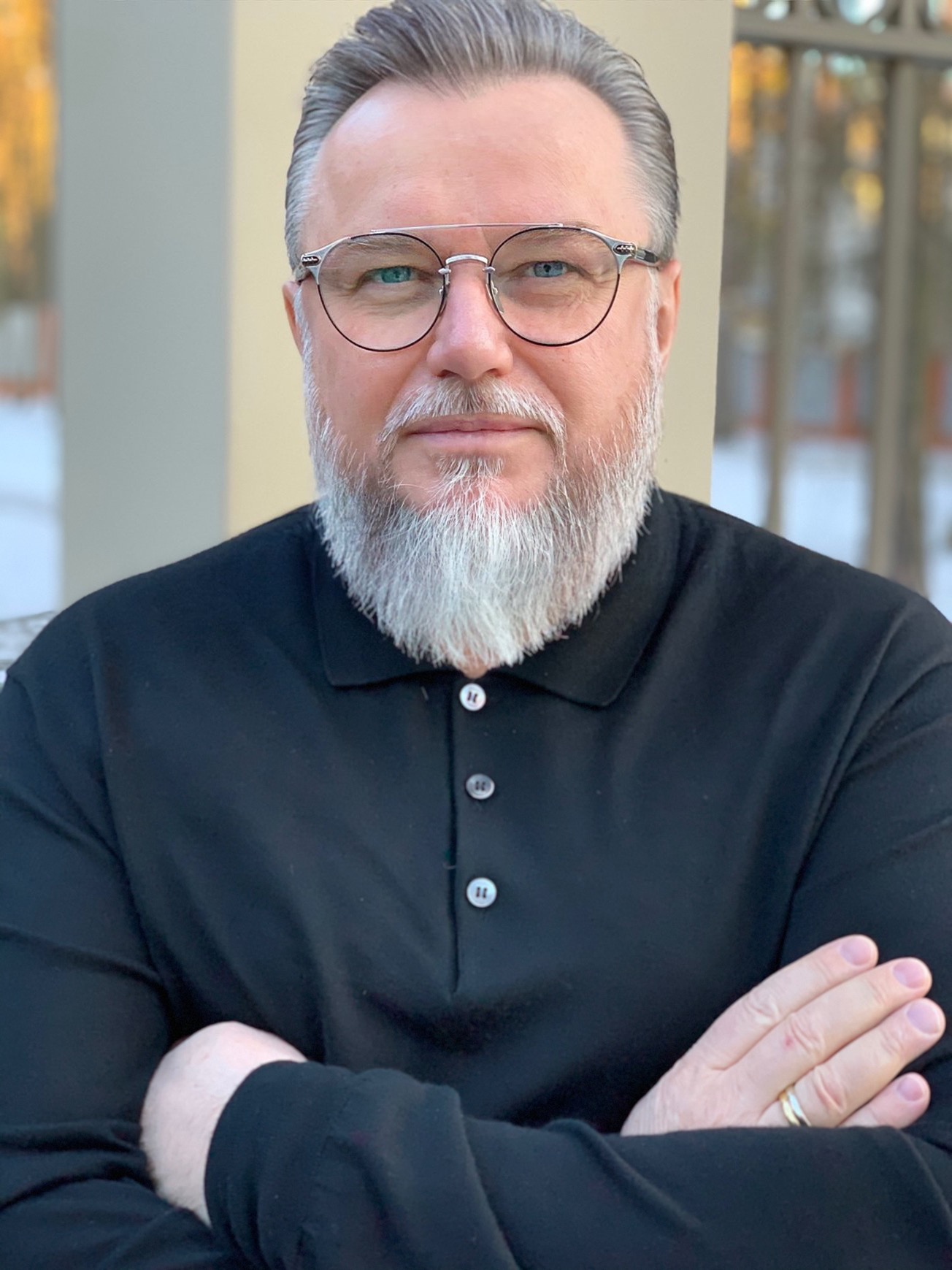
- Born: November 17, 1963 (age 62); Rivne, Ukrainian SSR, Soviet Union (now Ukraine)
- Occupation: Statesman Politician Director

Ihor Mykhailovych Bakai, sometimes spelled as Igor Bakai, (Note: depending if transliterated from Ukrainian or Russian languages) (Ukrainian: Ігор Михайлович Бакай; born 17 November 1963 in Rivne, Ukrainian SSR) is a former Ukrainian statesman, and politician, Director of the Naftogaz (1998–2000). Afraid of criminal charges against him, Bakai fled Ukraine to Russia following the Orange Revolution, where in 2005 he received citizenship.

In 1994 – 1996 he was a president of companies "Respublika" and which later became "Intergaz" and had both Klychko brothers (Wladimir and Vitali) as his bodyguards.

In 1996 – 2002 Bakai was a member of the Verkhovna Rada (Ukrainian parliament). Initially, he was elected in 1996 as a non-partisan from Kyiv Oblast. In the parliament he was a member of a deputy group "Constitutional Center" and a parliamentary committee on ecological policy.

According to correspondents of Ukrayinska Pravda, Bakai while heading Naftogaz in 1998–2000 has earned around $1 billion. At the end of 1990s Ukraine was consuming 75 billion metric cubes of gas per year, which was fourth indicator in the world, while the country was not among top 20 countries in the GDP volume. In addition to that, Ukraine on its own was drilling 18 billion metric cubes of gas by Naftogas along with some smaller Ukrainian companies.

In 2010, he was involved in scandal around the Schlosshotel Bühlerhöhe. Because of that, previous owner of the hotel Dietmar Hopp filed a lawsuit against Bakai to recover 14 million euros debt.

== Notes ==
Government offices
| New title | Director of Naftogaz; 1998-2000 | Succeeded by Vasyl Rozhonyuk as acting |
| Preceded by Yuriy Dahayev | Chair of State Management of Affairs; 2003–2004 | Succeeded by Ihor Tarasiuk |
