= Valentyna Astakhova =

Ukrainian historian (born 1935)

Valentyna Astakhova

Valentyna Ilarionivna Astakhova (nee Pyatykhina; born 4 April 1935) is a Soviet and Ukrainian historian, doctor of historical sciences (1981), professor (1983), academician of the Academy of Sciences of the Higher School of Ukraine (2004), advisor to the rector, former rector of Kharkiv Humanitarian University People's Ukrainian Academy. Knight of the Order of Princess Olga III (1997) and II (2004) degrees, Honored Worker of Education of the Ukrainian SSR, recipient of the Badge of the Ministry of Education and Culture of Ukraine "Excellence in Education," Honorary Doctor of the Academy of Pedagogical Sciences of Ukraine, Honorary Citizen of Kharkiv (2011).

== Early life and education ==
Valentyna Astakhova was born on 4 April 1935 in Dnipropetrovsk (now Dnipro, Ukraine). After graduating from secondary school No. 136 in Kharkiv in 1952, she studied at the history faculty of M. Gorky Kharkiv State University (now V. N. Karazin Kharkiv National University), graduating with honors in 1957.

== Career ==
After graduation, Astakhova worked as a history teacher at secondary school No. 36 in Kharkiv, where a school museum dedicated to the activities of the Russian revolutionary Artem (Fiodor Sergeev) was created on her initiative. In 1961, she entered the post-graduate course at Maxim Gorky Kharkiv State University, and in 1964 she defended her candidate's thesis.

In 1964–1978, Astakhova taught at the History and Mechanics-Mathematics Faculties of Maxim Gorky KhSU. She was one of the initiators of the opening of the History Museum of Kharkiv State University in 1972. In 1978, Astakhova became the head of the department of the Kharkiv Law Institute of Feliks Dzerzhinsky (now Yaroslav Mudryi National Law University).

In 1981, Astakhova successfully defended her doctoral dissertation Regularities of the formation and development of the socialist intelligentsia at the M. V. Lomonosov Moscow State University, and in 1983 she was awarded the scientific title of professor.

Astakhova was the author of the concept and the initiator of the creation of the first in Ukraine educational and scientific complex of continuous education at Kharkiv Humanitarian University "People's Ukrainian Academy", from preschool to higher education. In 1991–2011, she was the rector of Kharkiv Humanitarian University "People's Ukrainian Academy," and since 2011 - the advisor to the rector of the same university.

In 2004, Astakhova became a member of the public organization of the Academy of Sciences of the Higher School of Ukraine. In 2011, she was awarded a title of an honorary citizen of Kharkiv for her significant contribution to education in the city of Kharkiv.

== Social activities ==
During 1972–1992, Astakhova participated in numerous seminars, courses, schools for young lecturers, and regional competitions, which later turned into public speaking competitions held in Kharkiv.

In 1980, she was a member of the All-Union Art "Knowledge" delegation to the USA.

In 1985, Astakhova was a member of the Ukrainian SSR delegation at the 40th session of the UN General Assembly.

During 1989–1993, she was the chairman of the board of the Kharkiv regional organization of the "Knowledge" Society and a member of the Presidium of the republican women's union.

In 2003, she joined the "Congress of Business Women of Ukraine." As of 2023, she is the vice president of the All-Ukrainian and the president of the Eastern Ukrainian branch of the Association of Non-State Educational Institutions of Ukraine, a member of the Kharkiv Council of Rectors.

Astakhova is an honorary member of the Sociological Association of Ukraine and the Specialized Council for the Defense of Doctoral and Candidate's Dissertations at V. N. Karazin Kharkiv National University.

Astakhova was the initiator of many cultural projects, including the construction of the first student chapel of St. Tatiana in Ukraine (27 Lermontovska St.), the opening in 2001 of the "Fire of Knowledge" monument (27 Lermontovska St.), the opening of the Ukrainian Studies Center in 1996, in 2009, the first Russian Culture Center in Ukraine and in 2010, the Armenian Cultural and Educational Center, opening in 2010 of the Alley of Memory in honor of the 65th anniversary of the Victory in the Great Patriotic War.

Astakhova was also one of the initiators and organizers of the "Georgian Ribbon" action in Kharkiv, held in the city since 2004. The Kharkiv Humanitarian University "People's Ukrainian Academy” team joined the first in Ukraine.

== Scientific work ==
Astakhova is the author of more than 700 scientific and scientific-methodological publications. Under her supervision, more than 25 candidates and 6 doctoral theses were defended. Her scientific interests include the problems of sociology of education. She is the editor-in-chief of "Scientific Notes of Kharkiv Humanitarian University "People's Ukrainian Academy".

Astakhova is the founder and head of the scientific school "Formation of the Intellectual Potential of Society at the Turn of the Century: Economic, Political, Socio-Cultural Aspects and Forecasts." Astakhova initiated publishing essays on the life and activities of the rectors of Kharkiv universities and five collections of materials dedicated to the best teachers of secondary schools in the Kharkiv region.

== Awards and honors ==
- Honored Worker of Education of the Ukrainian SSR (1990)
- Order of Princess Olga III degree (1997)
- Order of Princess Olga II degree (2004)
- Order "1020th Anniversary of the Baptism of Kyivan Rus" of the Ukrainian Orthodox Church of the Moscow Patriarchate (2008)
- Honorary citizen of the city of Kharkiv (2011) — "for significant contribution to the field of education of the city of Kharkiv"
- Honorary Diploma of the Verkhovna Rada of Ukraine "For significant contribution in services to the Ukrainian people"
- Medal of Pushkin (Russian Federation) (2012)
