= Naftogaz =

Ukrainian state-owned gas company

Naftogaz of Ukraine
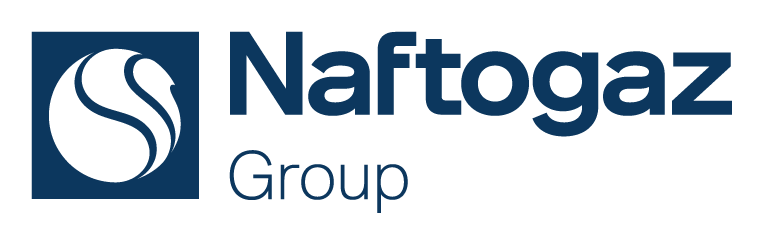
- Official logo

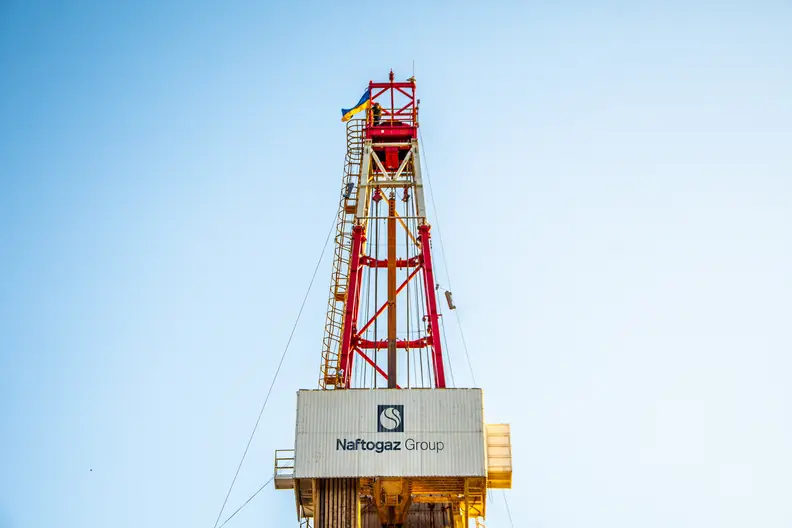
- Naftogaz drilling rig
- Native name: Нафтогаз України
- Type: National joint-stock company
- Industry: Oil and gas
- Founded: 1991; 35 years ago (Founded, as Ukrgasprom); 1998; 28 years ago (Current form)
- Founder: Cabinet of Ministers of Ukraine
- Headquarters: Kyiv, Ukraine
- Key people: Serhiy Fedorenko, Acting Head of the Board
- Products: Natural gas, crude oil, condensate, petrol
- Services: Pipeline transportation, oil production, gas production, municipal heating
- Revenue: ▲€8.163 billion (2018)
- Net income: ▼€368.41 million (2018)
- Total assets: ▼€19.228 billion (2018)
- Total equity: ▼€13.181 billion (2018)
- Owner: Government of Ukraine
- Number of employees: 100,000 (November 2023)
- Parent: Cabinet of Ministers of Ukraine
- Divisions: Mining and refinery, transportation, distribution
- Subsidiaries: Ukrgasvydobuvannya, Ukrtransgaz, Ukrnafta, Naftogaz Digital Technologies, Chornomornaftogaz, Ukrtransnafta, Naukanaftogaz, Gaz of Ukraine, GSC Naftogaz of Ukraine, Likvo, Ukrspetstransgaz
- Website: naftogaz.com, naftogaz-europe.com

Naftogaz of Ukraine (Ukrainian: НАК "Нафтогаз України", Naftogaz Ukrainy; literally "Petroleum-Gas of Ukraine") is the largest national oil and gas company of Ukraine. It is a state-owned company subordinated to the Government of Ukraine. The vertically-integrated company carries out a complete cycle of exploration, extraction, transportation, and refinement of natural gas and crude oil, and the supply of natural and liquefied gas to consumers.

Ukraine's system of trunk natural gas pipelines and underground natural gas depots is operated by Ukrtransgaz, a subsidiary of Naftogaz. The company operates 38,200 km of high pressure gas transit pipelines and has more than 30 billion cubic meters of gas storage capacity. This major gas infrastructure located between Russia and the European Union has led the company to feature prominently in regional politics. Another subsidiary of Naftogaz, Gas of Ukraine, is responsible for domestic gas distribution to the local district heating companies.

Naftogaz is a major Ukrainian employer with over 100,000 employees (as of 2025).

The former PwC management consultant Andriy Kobolyev took over as CEO after the 2014 Ukrainian revolution tasked with reducing the country's dependence on Russian gas and reforming the company's business practices.

On 29 April 2025, the Supervisory Board of Naftogaz appointed Serhii Koretskyi as the new CEO of the company.

The group is one of Ukraine's largest taxpayers. The net consolidated profit of Naftogaz Group companies in 2023 amounted to UAH 23.1 billion against a loss of UAH 79.1 billion a year earlier.

During 2024, the Group generated a net profit of UAH 38 billion, up UAH 15 billion or 64% from 2023. Gross profit for 2024 rose to UAH 89.1 billion, up from UAH 48.5 billion in 2023. Operating profit reached UAH 51.1 billion, an increase of nearly UAH 13.3 billion, or 32%, compared to the previous year.

== History ==
=== 1991–1998: Ukrgasprom ===
After the dissolution of the Soviet Union in 1991, the oil and gas industry of Ukraine, governed by Derzhnaftogasprom (State Committee for Oil and Gas), went through a number of changes. The National Energy and Utilities Regulatory Commission (NEURC) was giving out certification for gas trading to anyone without order ignoring the Derzhnaftogasprom. Guided by decisions of the First Vice-Prime Minister (on Fuel and Energy Complex) Pavlo Lazarenko, licenses were given to such companies like United Energy Systems of Ukraine (EESU), Intergas, Olgas, International Trading Energy Resources Association (ITERA), Ukrzakordonnaftogas, Ukrgasprom, Motor Sich, and Donetsk Oblast factories (later those formed the Industrial Union of Donbas).

In the early 1990s, there was privatization of gas distribution regional network known as "oblgaz" belonging to "Ukrgas". When Naftogaz was constituted, not all privately owned distributors wanted to transfer their own stocks to the statutory fund of the National Joint Stock Company. Along with the gas distribution network in the same way there were privatized enterprises of petroleum products provision including filling station and fuel repositories that belonged to "Ukrnaftoprodukt". The whole petroleum products retail network had to be created by Naftogaz from zero.

The predecessor of Naftogaz is "Ukrgasprom".

On 28 January 1995 after discussion with government the condition of agreements realization in provision for Ukraine gas imported from Russia and Turkmenistan, the head of "Ukrgasprom" Bohdan Kliuk was dismissed from his post on decision of the Cabinet of Ministers. Bohdan Kliuk who was appointed on 6 December 1994, on 19 December 1994 signed an agreement with "Gazprom" on distribution of gas for Ukraine under disadvantageous conditions. The issue with Kliuk provided Bakai with an argument to create Naftogaz.

=== 1998–2014 ===
The company was founded in 1998 after previously being named Ukrgazprom. The main initiators who created the company were Ihor Didenko and Ihor Bakai (better known as Igor Bakai). The last one was the first deputy chairman of the Ukrainian State Committee on Oil and Gas. Before Naftogaz, both Bakai and Didenko worked for other gas trading companies "Republic Corporation" and "Intergas".

At the end of the 1990s, Ukraine was consuming a record of 75 billion m^{3} per year which was the fourth indicator in the world and seemed strange to say the least considering that the country was not part of the top 20 in GDP volume. Eighteen billion m^{3} were mined inside Ukraine by Naftogaz along with some joint enterprises such as "Poltavska Naftogazova Kompania", Plast, Ukrnaftogastekhnologia and others. All the gas that was mined by Naftogaz and received through transit in obligatory order was being sold to population and state organizations. The remaining volume of natural gas, Ukraine was receiving from Russia as part of payment for transit or was buying from Turkmenistan. That gas was sold to industrial enterprises or was being re-exported.

Also, instead of investing more funds in geological exploration for the Ukrgasprom, its money was used to patch budget and foreign debts holes, which led to decrease in mining of hydrocarbons and decline of industry. Most of the oil refineries were sold out to Russian companies. The only refinery that belongs to Naftogaz is Shebelynsky Gas Refinery which Naftogaz controls through Ukrgasvydobuvannia.

Ukraine never had enough mined oil resources capable to provide for oil refining capacity that Ukraine inherited from the Soviet Union. Most successful in oil mining is Ukrnafta, however recently Chornomornaftogaz had more and more plans to develop newly found deposits.

Before 2001 Ukraine had two state enterprises in transportation of oil "Main oil pipeline "Druzhba" and "Cisdnieper main oil pipeline". The pipelines were often used by Russian companies, but after Ukraine built connecting pipeline Odesa – Brody (Black Sea coast – West Ukraine) Russian companies installed an alternative pipe route Sukhodolnaya–Rodionovskaya.

In 2001 several Ukrainian parliamentarians made inquiry to the Prosecutor's General Office, Tax Agency, and Security Service requesting to open a criminal case against the head of Presidential Administration Volodymyr Lytvyn, the former chairman of Naftogaz Ihor Bakai, the administration chairmen of joint-stock company "Ukrgasprom" Bohdan Kliuk, the director of state enterprise "Ukrgasprom" Illia Fik, and others. Those parliamentarians were Hryhoriy Omelchenko, Anatoliy Yermak, and Viktor Shyshkin.

As of 31 December 2008, Naftogaz with its subsidiaries had a total of 172,000 employees. Naftogaz received more than $6 billion of subsidies in domestic bonds from 2009 to 2012 as regulated gas prices and expensive Russian energy imports led to heavy losses.

The 2009 Russia–Ukraine gas dispute was eventually settled by the 2010 Kharkiv Pact.

=== 2014–present ===
In August 2014, Ukrtransgaz, the operator of the Ukrainian gas transport system, along with its Slovak counterpart "Eustream", launched natural gas supplies from Slovakia to Ukraine after signing a Memo of mutual understanding in April. This initiative was driven by Russia's decision in June to cease gas supplies to Ukraine in retaliation for the country seeking closer ties with the European Union. By launching reverse flows, Ukraine claims it is seeking no concessions – only implementation of existing EU law on EU territory. The Third Energy Package was proposed by the European Commission in 2007 and adopted by the European Parliament and the Council of the European Union in July 2009. This legislation allows for gas to be traded like other commodities, thus creating a more efficient market which is theoretically less vulnerable to political pressure. In October 2014 the EU further committed to better connecting its energy grids, setting a target of member countries exporting 15% of their generation capacity by 2030. The consultancy firm Strategy& (formerly Booz & Co) believes the EU could save €40bn a year by 2030 if it integrates its energy grids.

Norway's energy giant Statoil began transiting gas eastwards from Slovakia in 2014, and Shell began in 2015.

In response to the reverse flows initiative, Russia has cut supplies to central and eastern European countries, seeking to prevent exports to Ukraine. In September, Hungary stopped supplying gas to Ukraine, days after a meeting between Hungarian Prime Minister Orban and Gazprom's CEO. Gazprom charges widely different prices to different European countries, which many believe is based on Russia's political goals in the region.

In June 2014 Ukraine sought redress from the Stockholm Chamber of Commerce Arbitration Institute to fairly assess past debts between the two countries and to establish a fair basis of future operations.

In March 2018, Naftogaz won a trial against Russian Gazprom for shortened gas supplies before the Arbitration Institute of the Stockholm Chamber of Commerce, and was set to receive net amount of $2.56 billion.

As of 31 December 2017, Naftogaz had around 72,000 employees and annual revenue of €7.443 billion. Of total revenue, €2.908 billion (39.07%) is generated from oil and gas production, €2.415 billion (32.45%) from oil and gas transit, €1.137 billion (15.28%) from oil transmission and sales and €817 million (10.98%) is generated from gas transmission and sales. A total transit volume in 2017 stood at six-year maximum of 93 billion cubic meters. Russian gas flows via Ukraine were suspended on January 1, 2025, following the expiration of the five-year transit deal signed in 2019, after which Ukraine ceased to be the main transit country of Russian gas to the European Union countries.

In April 2019, the Chinese Sinosure agreed to loan $1 billion in insurance coverage to Naftogaz.

In October 2019, Naftogaz was involved in the impeachment proceedings against President Donald Trump in the US, when news broke that a group of businessmen alleged to be very close to the President and his personal lawyer, Rudy Giuliani, intervened in an attempt to change the management of Naftogaz. An Associated Press report reveals how businessmen Lev Parnas, Igor Fruman and Harry Sargeant III allegedly attempted to replace Naftogaz's CEO, Andriy Kobolyev, and sought to broker a deal to sell their own natural gas to the company.

In the first half of 2022, Naftogaz had a deficit of $1.6 billion and as a consequence, went into default.

In October 2023, the head of Naftogaz, Oleksiy Chernyshov, said that the company does not plan to renew the contract with Russian gas company Gazprom, which ends at the end of 2024. He named the needs of European partners as the only reason why Ukraine still pumps Russian gas.

On 14 May 2025, Sergii Koretskyi was appointed to Naftogaz Group CEO.

The European Bank for Reconstruction and Development (EBRD) gave Naftogaz a €500 million loan in August 2025. The 2 year loan will assist Naftogaz to finance emergency gas purchases and it was signed with 90% guarantee from the European Commission.

In October 2025, Russia attacked the Naftogaz facilities located in the northeastern Kharkiv and central Poltava regions. The sites were hit from fired missiles and drones which damages a large area of the facilities.

==== 2026 seizure of Russian state assets to compensate Naftogaz ====
In June 2025, the Federal Supreme Court of Switzerland ruled in favour of Naftogaz over its September 2022 claim against Gazprom, which refused to fully pay for gas transit services under the 2019 Russia-Ukraine Gas Transit Agreement (which expired on 1 January 2025) since the beginning of the 2022 Russian invasion of Ukraine. The Swiss Supreme Court ordered Gazprom to pay 1.4 billion USD to Naftogaz for breach of contract. In May 2026, the Astana International Financial Centre Court in Kazakhstan recognised the Swiss ruling, and granted permission to enforce this arbitration award in Kazakhstan.

In early June 2026, the National Enforcement Authority of Finland provisionally seized 3.7 million euros in Russian state funds intended to compensate Naftogaz for its losses suffered by Russia's seizure of Naftogaz' assets in occupied Crimea since 2014. Naftogaz and its subsidiaries had filed a compensation claim against the Russian Federation, and in 2023, the Permanent Court of Arbitration in The Hague ordered Russia to pay approximately 4.3 billion euros in compensation to Naftogaz. International law stipulates that countries which recognise the ruling (which Russia does not), can enforce it within their jurisdictions by seizing Russian state assets, and the Helsinki District Court in late May 2026 approved the enforcement of 2023 ruling. The 3.7 million euros come from a defunct cross-border cooperation programme from the European Union involving Finland and Russia, to which Russia had contributed about 3.7 million euros before it launched its full-scale invasion of Ukraine in February 2022. As the programme was subsequently terminated in response to the invasion, the funds remained under control of the Finnish Ministry of Economic Affairs and Employment until the temporary seizure in June 2026; if the ruling becomes permanent, the money would be given to Naftogaz in compensation.

== Three Gas Wars ==
=== The first war ===
According to Gazprom, in February 1993, Ukraine's debt exceeded 138 billion rubles. That year Gazprom signed an agreement in Warsaw on the construction of a transit gas pipeline "Yamal–Europe pipeline" bypassing Ukraine via the territory of Poland. In August, the export of energy resources to Ukraine was first terminated for five days.

In 1994, there were stops of gas supplies and new debt repayment requirements by transferring rights to Ukrainian gas pipelines and enterprises.

In 1997, the Treaty on Friendship, Cooperation, and Partnership between Ukraine and the Russian Federation, colloquially known as the 1997 Friendship Treaty, was signed under the auspices of the United Nations in Kiev. The treaty included provisions on respecting territorial integrity, financial and economic cooperation, cultural and informational exchange, and the Black Sea Fleet. Upon going into effect, the treaty annulled the 1990 treaty between the RSFR and USFR.

=== The second war ===
At the end of 2005, Gazprom, in negotiations with Ukraine on the mode of transit and gas supplies, decided to increase gas price from 50–80$ to 160–170$ per thousand m³. Ukraine refused to sign contracts for gas supply until 2006.

On January 1, 2009, gas was discontinued for Ukraine, and since January 5, Gazprom decreased its supply for European consumers.

On April 21, 2010, in Kharkiv Viktor Yanukovych and Dmitry Medvedev signed a new agreement on the cost of procurement and transit of gas through the Ukrainian GTS, linking a decrease in the price of 30% with a continuation of the Rent Agreement for Sevastopol Naval Base for 25 years, by 2042.

=== Gazprom and Naftogaz Association ===
In July 2010, Prime Minister of Ukraine Mykola Azarov said that the Government of Ukraine is negotiating the creation of a gas transportation consortium between Ukraine, the EU and Russia.

On January 25, 2011 EU Energy Commissioner Günther Oettinger first stated that the allocation of funds of the EU for modernization of the Ukrainian GTS depends on the guarantees of Russia to the gas market to Europe, and advised the authorities to persuade the Russian side to refuse to build a Southern Stream gas pipeline and to finance modernization of the Ukrainian GTS. Oettinger mentioned that the total bandwidth in the 2011–2012 submarine gas pipeline with a capacity of 55 billion m³ and the projected gas pipeline "Southern Flood" with a capacity of 63 billion m³ will be 118 billion m³ and will allow Russia to supply gas to the EU without the help of Ukraine or Belarus.

== Structure and leadership ==
As of 31 December 2017, the Naftogaz has ownership shares in the following companies:

=== Production and refinery ===
- Ukrgasvydobuvannya (UGV) (100%), a subsidiary
- Zakordonnaftogaz (100%), a subsidiary
- Ukrnafta (50% + 1), open joint-stock association
- Petrosannan Company (50%), Egypt-based joint-stock association
- Carpatygaz LLC (49.99%), joint-stock association

=== Transportation ===
- Ukrtransgaz (100%), a subsidiary
- Ukrtransnafta (100%), open joint-stock association
- Ukrspetstransgaz (100%), state joint-stock association

=== Wholesale and distribution ===
- Gaz of Ukraine
  - Gas Distribution Networks of Ukraine
- Naftogaz Trading Europe S.A (100%), Swiss based company
- Kirovohradgaz (100%)
- Ukravtogaz (100%)

=== Subsidiary enterprises ===
- Vuhlesyntezgaz Ukraiiny (100%)
- Naftogaz-Energoservice (100%)

=== Leadership ===
Directors of the company since 1998:

- 1998–2000 Ihor Bakai
- 2000–2000 Vasyl Rozghonyuk (acting)
- 2000–2000 Ihor Didenko
- 2000–2002 Vadym Kopylov
- 2002–2005 Yuriy Boyko
- 2005–2006 Oleksiy Ivchenko
- 2006–2006 Oleksiy Bolkisyev
- 2006–2007 Volodymyr Sheludchenko
- 2007–2007 Yevhen Bakulin
- 2007–2010 Oleh Dubyna
- 2010–2014 Yevhen Bakulin
- 2014–2021 Andriy Kobolyev
- 2021–2022 Yuriy Vitrenko
- 2022–2024 Oleksiy Chernyshov
- 2024–2025 Roman Chumak (acting)
- 2025–2026 Serhii Koretskyi
- 2026– Serhiy Fedorenko (acting)

== International activities ==
Ukraine now plays a vital role in both the storage and transit of gas in Europe and in improving EU energy security. Ukraine has the largest storage capacity in Europe, which enables the country and its European partners to accumulate over 30 bcm of gas during summer periods when prices are lowest. Ukraine is also a strategically placed transit hub. It has the ability to transfer gas from central Europe to South-Eastern Europe, which relies heavily on Russian gas. Naftogaz asserts its intention to increase flow of Ukrainian gas into central and South-Eastern Europe, cutting Russian gas out of the EU market and decreasing the ability of Russia to apply political pressure to the region.

The company drills for oil in the Western Desert in Egypt. On December 13, 2006, Naftogaz and the Egyptian General Petroleum Corporation had signed an agreement on the exploration and development of oil and gas deposits on the eastern territory of Alam El Shawish East in the Western Egyptian desert. In 2014 Naftogaz began natural gas extraction in Egypt. The company's oil production in Egypt estimated at 260,000 tonnes for 2014, which is more than 10% of annual production in Ukraine. A new natural gas pipeline allowing for extraction of approximately 300,000 cubic meters per day has also been launched.

Naftogaz put a stop to Russian gas supplies to European customers through its pipelines in January 2025 after the original transit agreement from 2019 expired and was not renewed.

An LNG supply agreement was signed in August 2025 between Naftogaz and Polish energy group Orlen. The agreement is for an additional 140 million cubic meters of LNG from the US through the pipelines in Poland.

In November 2025, Naftogaz signed an agreement with Greece for the supply of US-origin LNG through supplier DEPA's pipelines. The supply agreement ran from December 2025 until March 2026.

== Corruption ==
The Yanukovych government was famously despotic and corrupt. Naftogaz has been seen as one of the biggest sources of corruption in Ukraine for years with many of the country's billionaires having acquired much of their wealth through gas arbitrage based on differences between the prices of Russian gas imports, gas exports to the EU and government energy subsidies to homes and businesses.

== Yevgeny Bakulin ==
Yevgeny Bakulin, who was a close ally of former deputy prime minister Yuri Boiko, was appointed as the chief executive of state energy company Naftogaz in 2010 by the ousted president Viktor Yanukovich. Ukrainian police detained Bakulin in connection with a corruption investigation. Yevgeny Bakulin is still under three separate investigations into suspected corruption in the gas industry that has cost the Ukrainian state about $4 billion. Bakulin's arrest is related to Dmytro Firtash's arrest in Vienna on the 13th of March, 2014, as a direct consequence of Firtash's arrest charges filed by FBI. This is due to the fact that Bakulin was an important player in the corruption scheme of Dmytro Firtash, Serhiy Lyovochkin, a Ukrainian politician – and Yuri Boiko, the former Energy Minister. Bakulin is suspected of heading a "criminal group" whose members include other senior current and former Ukrainian government members. Ukrainian police seized 42 kilograms of gold and $4.8 million in cash during a search of the apartments. Ukrainian investigators charged Bakulin with the theft of $243.5m from the company in one single case. Minister of Internal Affairs Arsen Avakov in comments at the time of Bakulin's arrest accused him of complicity in the theft of over $4bn from the company during his time in office from 2010 to 2014.

Ukraine's parliament approved the stripping of immunity from prosecution from Bakulin, a lawmaker from the Opposition Bloc, and to allow his arrest. The Prosecutor General's Office has charged Bakulin with the embezzlement of particularly large amounts of money while he was serving as the head of Ukraine's state oil and gas company, Naftogaz of Ukraine, in 2010. The embezzlement was part of the so-called "Boyko's Drilling Rigs" case, when, reportedly under the supervision of the Fuel and Energy Minister at the time, Yuriy Boyko, Naftogaz purchased two oil and gas rigs for $800 million, almost a double their real price, and allegedly laundered the overpaid money – some $330 million. Bakulin didn't attend the parliament session, and despite the Rada's approval of his arrest, he still had an opportunity to escape, as Prosecutor General Yuriy Lutsenko earlier told parliament that Bakulin was abroad now.

On 25 April 2014, four weeks after he was detained, a Kyiv court released Bakulin on bail of only ₴10 million, around $1 million. He is believed to have since left the country to Russia, ostensibly for urgent medical treatment in Israel.

Bakulin is currently wanted for being a subject of "Boyko's tower" case. The Swiss Federal Criminal Court has granted assistance to Ukraine in the Bakulins case. Accused of fraud, he would have cashed million dollars on Swiss bank accounts in the name of his son and daughter, Nikolay and Svetlana, and Bakulin's sister Tatyana Malygina to buy real estates in Germany and Austria.

Bakulin's link to Naftogaz illustrates why the continued influence of oligarchs will likely hamper the country's drive to reform.

In October 2014, George Soros named Naftogaz to be "a black hole in the budget and a major source of corruption" and called for reform of the company, which could "totally eliminate Ukraine's dependence on Russia for gas". Radio Free Europe/Radio Liberty produced a short documentary entitled "The Palaces of Ukraine's Oil and Gas Men" about the homes of Naftogaz management during the presidency of Viktor Yanukovych, who was overthrown in 2014.

== See also ==
- Natural gas transmission system of Ukraine
- Natural gas in Ukraine
