= Chernyshov =

Chernyshov (masculine, Russian: Чернышов) or Chernyshova (feminine, Russian: Чернышова) is a Russian-language surname. Notable people with the surname include:

- Alexey Chernyshov (born 1963), Russian politician
- Andrey Chernyshov (born 1968), Russian association football manager and former player
- Boris Chernyshov (born 1991), Russian politician
- Galina Chernyshova (born 1993), Russian cyclist
- Igor Chernyshov (footballer) (born 1984), Russian football player
- Igor Chernyshov (ice hockey) (born 2005), Russian ice hockey player
- Konstantin Chernyshov (born 1967), Russian chess grandmaster
- Oleg Chernyshov (born 1986), Russian football player
- Oleksiy Chernyshov (born 1977), Ukrainian politician
- Pavel Chernyshov (born 1995), Belarusian football player
- Polina Chernyshova (born 1993), Russian actress
- Venera Chernyshova (born 1954), Soviet biathlete
- Vladislav Chernyshov (born 1981), Kazakh–Kyrgyz football player
- Yelizaveta Chernyshova (born 1958), Soviet hurdler
- Yevgeni Chernyshov (born 1947), Soviet handball player
