= Vadym Kopylov =

Ukrainian politician

- Вадим Копилов

Chairman of the Board of Naftogaz Ukraine
- In office July 14, 2000 – February 5, 2002
- Preceded by: Ihor Didenko
- Succeeded by: Yuriy Boyko

Personal details
- Born: 19 September 1958 (age 68) Kadiivka, Luhansk Oblast, Ukrainian SSR
- Education: Moscow State Mining University

Vadym Anatoliiovych Kopylov (Ukrainian: Вадим Анатолійович Копилов) is a Ukrainian statesman.

He has served as deputy chairman of State Tax Service of Ukraine, deputy minister of Coal Industry, Finance, first deputy minister of Fuel and Energy, Finance, Economic Development and Trade of Ukraine. Chairman of the Board of Naftogaz Ukraine in 2000–2002 years.

== Biography ==
=== Early years ===
Vadym Kopylov was born on September 19, 1958, in Kadiivka (formerly Stakhanov) (Luhansk Oblast, Ukrainian SSR). In 1980, he graduated from the Moscow State Mining University (specialty: mining engineer and economist).

=== Career ===
- 1980–1984: mining master, district mining setter, chairman of Labor and Wages Department in Mine named XXII Congress of the CPSU of production association Stahanovvuhillya
- 1984–1989: chief economist, Mine named Kirov of production association Stahanovvuhillya
- 1989–1994: chairman of Planning and Economic Department, deputy general director - director of economics of production association Luganskvuhillya
- 1994–1996: deputy minister of Coal Industry
- 1996 - deputy general director of the production association Luganskvuhillya
- 1996–1998: chairman of General Department of enforcement of tax payments (State Tax Administration of Ukraine)
- 1998–2000: deputy chairman of the State Tax Administration of Ukraine
- July 14, 2000 – February 5, 2002: first deputy minister of Fuel and Energy - chairman of the board of Naftogaz Ukraine
- 2002–2003: deputy chairman of the State Tax Administration of Ukraine (again)
- 2003–2003: deputy state secretary (Ministry of Finance of Ukraine)
- 2003–2004: deputy minister of Finance
- 2004–2005: deputy chairman of the State Tax Administration of Ukraine (3d time)
- 2005–2006: chairman of the Supervisory Board of universal commercial bank Cambio
- 2006–2007: 1st deputy minister of Finance
- March 11, 2010 – December 28, 2010: 1st deputy minister of Finance (again)
- December 28, 2010 – 30 March 2012: 1st deputy minister of Economic Development and Trade
- February 14, 2012 – March 23, 2012: acting minister of Economic Development and Trade of Ukraine
