= Andriy Kobolyev =

Ukrainian businessperson

- Born: Andriy Kobolyev; 16 August 1978 (age 48); Kyiv, Ukrainian SSR, Soviet Union
- Education: Taras Shevchenko National University of Kyiv
- Occupations: Businessman, politician
- Known for: CEO of Naftogaz

Andríy Kóbolyev (Ukrainian: Андрíй Володѝмирович Кóболєв; born August 16, 1978) is a Ukrainian politician and businessman, and the former chief executive officer of Ukrainian largest company, the state-owned oil and gas company Naftogaz. In October 2014, Kobolyev was named a global "Top 40 under 40" (years of age) leader by Fortune in recognition of his anti-corruption reform successes.

In 2021, he co-founded Eney, a US-Ukrainian diversified decarbonization and clean energy company that builds and invests in projects that advance the Energy Transition in Ukraine and other Eastern European and Central Asian countries.

From 2020, Andriy Kobolyev has been a member of the supervisory board of Ukrainian telecommunications company Kyivstar.

Following the full-scale Russian invasion of Ukraine on February 24, 2022, Kobolyev became a key driver of Ukraine's effort to have western countries impose energy sanctions and embargoes against Russia.

In January 2023, Kobolyev was indicted for allegedly "paying himself" more than the statutory maximum allowed a state-owned enterprise employee in the form of a bonus he was awarded by the independent Naftogaz Supervisory Board, pursuant to a Ukrainian government-approved contract, for winning US $4.63 billion from Russia's PJSC Gazprom in the Stockholm Arbitration cases. Zelenskyy himself authorized payment of the performance bonus in 2020. The charges against Kobolyev were viewed by (his) former colleagues and anti-corruption activists as part of a Ukrainian government effort to eliminate prominent reformers and punish potential political rivals.

== Early life ==
The son of a scientist and an English teacher, Andriy Kobolyev was born in Kyiv on August 16, 1978. He studied abroad in the U.S. State of Iowa during his secondary school years. In 2000, he graduated from the Institute of International Relations of Taras Shevchenko National University of Kyiv with a master's degree in international economic relations.

== Career ==
=== Early career ===
Andriy Kobolyev started his career in PricewaterhouseCoopers (1999–2002), starting while he was still in university.

==== Initial time at Naftogaz (2002-2010) ====
He joined Naftogaz in 2002 as a consultant on corporate strategy. From 2006 to 2007, he was the Director of the Department for Corporate Finance and Price Policy, and from 2008 to 2010, he was an adviser to the CEO.

==== Investment banker (2010-2014) ====
From 2010 to 2014, Kobolyev was an adviser at AYA Capital private investment and banking group.

=== CEO of Naftogaz ===
Kobolyev took over as CEO of Naftogaz in March 2014 after the 2014 Ukrainian Revolution of Dignity. By his own account, he spent his years at Naftogaz fighting corruption, boosting profits, and lessening his nation's dependence on Russia. In 2014, Gazprom, the Russian state-owned energy group, supplied 90% of Ukraine's domestic needs, despite the fact that Ukraine has Europe's fourth-largest proven gas reserves, after Russia, Norway, and the Netherlands. A few months later, in summer 2014, Gazprom cut off natural gas supplies to Ukraine, citing billions of dollars in unpaid bills as the justification. Kobolyev was then faced with the challenges of negotiations with Gazprom, which was seeking to increase the price of gas to Ukraine by 80%. The situation was further complicated by domestic companies refusing to pay their debts, and by Russia seeking to prevent Ukraine importing gas from elsewhere in Europe. During his tenure he also oversaw the transformation of Naftogaz into a (partly) corporatized company, as well as the successful pursuit of lawsuits and arbitrations against Russia's Gazprom that earned Ukraine over US $4.63 billion in damage awards, and the unbundling of Naftogaz to bring it into compliance with the EU's anti-monopoly rules. By 2021, when he was removed as head of Naftogaz, he had successfully overseen the transformation of the company from a Soviet era loss making relic into contributing as much as 20% of Ukraine's annual national budget.

Diversification and freedom from Russian gas

Recognizing the national security and energy security vulnerabilities Ukraine's dependence on Russia gas caused Ukraine, Kobolyev spent his first two years at Naftogaz reducing Naftogaz's -- and thus Ukraine's -- dependence on gas from Gazprom, a crucial development for Ukraine. As a result of these efforts, Ukraine has not bought a single cubic metre of natural gas from Russia since 2015. All imported volumes come from the European market through Poland, Slovakia, and Hungary. In retaliation, during the winter of 2014–15, the Kremlin tried to block Ukraine's European gas imports by cutting natural gas supply to the EU. This move failed to have any tangible impact on Ukraine, although Gazprom lost almost US $5.5 billion in the process.

Kobolyev believed Ukraine has the potential to become self-sufficient in natural gas given its sizable reserves if a collaborative plan between the company, government, and private sector is devised.

Fighting with the corruption and oligarchs

For years, Naftogaz's top managers had been grappling with corrupt government officials, trying to overcome the hurdle they constitute to becoming a more modern, open market energy system in line with EU standards for the oil and gas trade. Kobolyev sought to loosen the grip of business and political leaders on Naftogaz, also a key foreign policy for western governments because of the traditionally outsized presence of corruption in Ukraine's energy sector. He started by removing several intermediaries that were earning "unjustified profits" by buying gas from Russia and selling it to Ukraine. By this time, RosUkrEnergo had already been sidelined, but other mediators had cropped up. Then, in 2015, Naftogaz cut off gas to two Firtash-controlled (Dmytro Firtash is a Ukrainian billionaire and oligarch under indictment and fighting extradition by the U.S. for corruption) chemical factories until they agreed to pay debts of $120 million. Firtash's company said the standoff lasted four months.

Kobolyev also pressed the Ukrainian government, overseen from April 2016 to August 2019 by Prime Minister Groysman, to scrap the regulations known as the Public Service Obligation that required Naftogaz as the country's gas monopoly to supply the non-paying intermediaries, known as oblagaz, with gas to it could be supplied to retail consumers, such as hospitals. In practice, much of the gas was not provided to the retail consumers and was instead arbitraged and sold illegally at a profit by the oblagazy. Kobolyev said his pleas to reform the system fell on deaf ears.

Kobolyev also tried to minimize the corrupt role in Ukraine's energy sector of oligarch Ihor Kolomoiskyi, a grizzled media, and banking tycoon. Kolomoiskyi controls Naftogaz's oil production arm, Ukrnafta, where he is a 49% minority shareholder.

Making Naftogaz the largest contributor to the state budget

Kobolyev worked to transform Naftogaz into a competitor in the regional energy market capable of generating needed cash. Naftogaz's financial performance improved under him. When he took over in March 2014, Naftogaz was losing billions of dollars a year. In 2018, it turned a profit and contributed through tax and dividend payments 15% of the Ukrainian government's total annual revenue. From 2015 to 2019 net contributions to the state budget were US $9 billion. In 2016 Naftogaz became the largest taxpayer in Ukraine.

In 2019, Naftogaz generated a net profit of UAH 50.6 billion, of which 95% was paid to the state as dividends. It was a new record for Naftogaz, or any other state-owned company in Ukraine. In 2019, 14% of state budget revenues was contributed by Naftogaz.

Kobolyev's moves toward transparency won him support among Western investors and donors. He was credited with overseeing an energy overhaul that helped Ukraine to narrow its budget deficit, and leading the former Soviet republic to a multibillion-dollar win in a legal dispute with Russian energy giant Gazprom in 2018.

Corporate governance reform

Naftogaz became the first state-owned company in Ukraine to introduce corporate governance best practices compliant with OECD Guidelines. The Corporate Governance Action Plan (CGAP), developed by experts and legal advisers, became the roadmap for reform. 2016 saw the first supervisory board formed with a majority of independent directors, supervisory board committees formed, a corporate secretary appointed, and the implementation of a proper corporate governance system. The corporatization and resulting independence of state-owned Naftogaz was an ongoing point of contention with the Ukrainian government, which proved reluctant to give up direct control over company decisionmaking. This resulted in multiple efforts by the government to remove or revise Naftogaz's corporate governance regime to restore measures of control to the government as sole shareholder. Kobolyev was frequently maligned as a consequence of his efforts to keep corporate governance reforms in place at the company, with the justification that those reforms were the reason why the company was becoming profitable. When Kobolyev was fired in March 2021 and Zelenskyy's government seized direct control of the company, the Naftogaz Supervisory Board resigned in protest.

Lobbying against Nord Stream 2

Kobolyev and Naftogaz's team instrumental in efforts to stop the $11 billion natural gas pipeline that Russia was building into Germany to reroute European Union-bound Russian gas supplies, circumventing established routes through Ukraine. On February 22, 2022, Germany stopped the Nord Stream 2 gas pipeline certification in reaction to Russia's recognition of the self-proclaimed republics in Luhansk and Donetsk in east Ukraine, the chancellor, Olaf Scholz, announced.

Naftogaz-Gazprom Arbitration

Naftogaz and Gazprom initiated the Gas Sales Arbitration on June 16, 2014. In its Request for Arbitration, Gazprom claimed payment of unpaid invoices for gas delivered under the Gas Sales Contract from November 2013 to May 2014, while Naftogaz claimed a retroactive revision of the price under the Gas Sales Contract and compensation for previous overpayments under the prices applied before the revision. On February 28, 2018, the tribunal issued the final award on the case of Naftogaz against Gazprom relating to the Gas Transit Contract. As a result, Naftogaz team won and successfully collected $4.63 billion from Gazprom, which was paid into Ukrainian state coffers at the end of 2019.

To incentivize Kobolyev and his 40-person team's dedication to pursuing victory against Gazprom in the Stockholm Arbitration, the Supervisory Board built into his contract a performance bonus to be awarded upon victory. In 2020, Zelenskyy authorized Kobolyev receiving the bonus pursuant to the contract, and the Ukrainian government paid him accordingly as a reward for winning the Stockholm Arbitration. The bonus was politically contentious, despite Ukraine's US $4.63 billion gains. In January 2023, citing the bonus, Kobolyev was indicted for allegedly "paying himself" more than the statutory maximum allowed a state-owned enterprise employee. The charges against Kobolyev are widely viewed as part of a Ukrainian government effort to eliminate reformers and punish potential political rivals.

Unbundling of the Gas Transmission System—De-monopolization

In 2019, to bring Ukraine into compliance with the 2014 Association with the EU that required in the imposition of EU anti-monopoly rules, Naftogaz performed unbundling of the gas transmission system (GTS) operator. The successful unbundling of the GTS operator made it possible to sign a new gas transit deal at the end of 2019 with Gazprom on beneficial terms for Ukraine. This new contract guarantees at least US$7.2 billion in stable revenues until 2024.

Naftogaz's retail business

On August 1, 2020, Ukraine abandoned the Public Service Obligation (PSO) regime that required supply of retail consumers regardless of receipt of payment. This allowed for natural gas retail supply market liberalization to finally take place, long a priority of western governments seeking to help reform Ukraine. Liberalization allowed household customers to choose the preferred gas supplier based on its value proposition. Suppliers, from their side, are now free to set the price and compete for customers. Although required by the EU Association Agreement and a commitment to reform-minded western partners, the reforms made Kobolyev the target of negative press because gas prices nominally increased above their previously government-set rate.

Naftogaz, led by Kobolyev, prepared well for market liberalization and outperformed its plans in terms of client portfolio growth, increasing its customer base 2.5 times from 251 thousand households as of August 1, 2020, to 619 thousand households by the end of 2020 (and 901 thousand customers as of March 31, 2021). Naftogaz became a national natural gas supplier to households, expanding its presence into all Ukrainian regions through an effective online and offline partnership model. In 2020, the company engaged nearly 2000 partner branches to subscribe and consult customers. As a result, Naftogaz's retail business has a national presence, having outperformed its plans in terms of customer growth by over 100% in 2020.

Death Threats and Assassination Attempts

Reforming Naftogaz, and with it Ukraine's gas sector, made Kobolyev deeply unpopular with corrupt vested interests, including oligarchs Kolomoyskyy and Firtash, used to enriching themselves via gas theft and illegal arbitrage. The Stockholm Arbitration performance bonus, irrespective of the $4.63 billion he and his team won for Ukraine from Gazprom, was compared unfavorably to the rise in gas prices for retail consumers due to the liberalization of the gas market and related reforms. These together made Kobolyev a target.

In November 2015, an unidentified gunman fired shots just over the roof of Kobolyev's car, hitting his house as he was leaving on a business trip. Kobolyev remarked at the time that the attempt on his life happened because of his anti-corruption activities, which made him many enemies in Ukraine, and was an act of intimidation. "Because if they wanted to kill, they probably would have shot with more accuracy," he said. Thereafter, he maintained a robust security detail.

The annual salary for charity

In January 2019, Kobolyev donated 11 months' salary to charity, from February 2019 to the end of 2019. The total amount of money Kobolyev donated during 2019 was UAH 11.4 million. Recipients included the Return Alive, Tabletochki, and Narodny Tyl – Rehabilitation foundations. The funds were used to buy equipment and outfits for Ukrainian soldiers in Donbas, to finance the training of officers through a new program, to buy medication for child cancer patients, to sponsor the recovery of children and relatives of killed soldiers, and to organize career guidance for 1,000 children from migrant families, orphanages and boarding schools.

Dismissal from Naftogaz

On April 28, 2021 the Cabinet of ministers of Ukraine dismissed Andriy Kobolyev from the post of the head of Naftogaz, and appointed Yuriy Vitrenko, in violation of Ukraine's Anti-Corruption Law, as a Chairman of the Board (CEO) of Naftogaz. The supervisory board, which the Cabinet of Ministers of Ukraine temporarily suspended in order to seize the control necessary to dismiss Kobolyev, resigned en masse in response effective May 14, 2021.

The European Union, the European Bank for Reconstruction and Development, the European Investment Bank, the World Bank, and the International Finance Corporation said in a joint statement on April 30 that they were "seriously concerned" about recent events at Naftogaz. Shortly after Kobolyev's dismissal, Naftogaz requested a multi-billion dollar bail out from the Ukrainian government due to the poorly timed cancellation by Vitrenko of Naftogaz's standing gas purchase orders just before prices began to spike globally. Naftogaz is currently in default on its loans to international finance institutions and other lenders.

=== CEO of Eney ===
Andriy Kobolyev is the CEO of Eney, diversified decarbonization and clean energy company that builds and invests in projects that advance the Energy Transition in Ukraine and other Eastern European and Central Asian countries. Eney's goal is to replace high greenhouse gas emission assets with clean alternatives, generate carbon neutral electricity or fuels, capture CO_{2} and other emissions, and build electricity storage capacity to enhance energy resilience. It focuses on the energy sector and champions the US, UK, and other cutting-edge technologies.

After the 2022 Russian invasion of Ukraine, Andriy Kobolyev is spearheading an international push for comprehensive western energy sanctions against Russia.
