= People's Ukrainian Academy =

Public university in Kharkiv, Ukraine

Coordinates: 50°00′18″N 36°15′26″E

- Народна українська академія
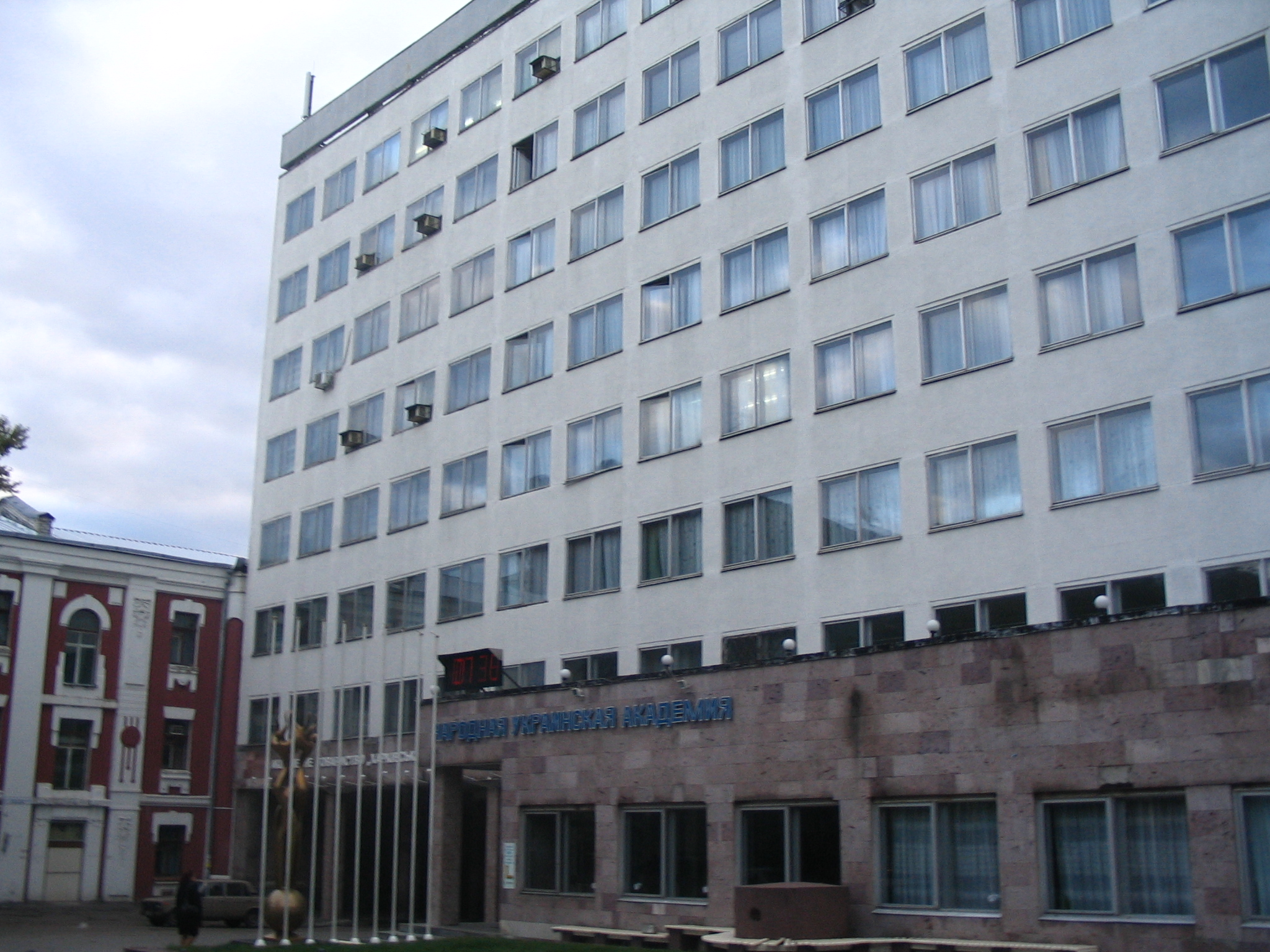
- Motto: Eruditio. Educatio. Cultura.
- Established: 1991
- Accreditation: Ministry of Education and Science of Ukraine
- Rector: Kateryna Astahova
- Students: 1 174
- Location: Kharkiv, Ukraine
- Website: www.nua.kharkov.ua

The People's Ukrainian Academy is a private institution of higher education in Kharkiv. Despite its full name (the Kharkiv University of Humanities' "People's Ukrainian Academy"), it is not affiliated with the University of Kharkiv.

== Campuses and buildings ==
KhUH “PUA” buildings are located in the center of Kharkiv. There is a library with reading halls and more than 160,000 books and periodicals. Within the Center of Information in Science and Humanities there is Media Library, Internet facilities, and a specialized education library. There are also sports and assembly halls, fitness and gymnastic halls, and a sports ground.

In the complex structure, there is a medical service that has dental, physiotherapy, and massage rooms. An agreement with city student hospital is signed where faculty and students are served.

The students’ trade union and students union have their own places. The Fireplace Hall was put into operation for conducting cultural events.

== Institutes and faculties ==
- University of Humanities:
  - Faculty “Business Administration”.

Trains economists in law, English and IT.

- Faculty “Translator-Interpreter”.

Trains translators-interpreters in two European languages and IT.

- Faculty “Social Management”.

Trains sociologists in psychology, English and IT.

- Faculty of part-time and distant learning.
- Faculty of post-graduate and additional education.

With post-graduate education faculty organizes work of “School 50+” (education of third age people) and MBA program.

- Department of PhD studies.
- Laboratory of Career Planning.
- Laboratory of Higher Education Problems.
- Laboratory of united cultural and educational environment.
- Children School of Early Development;

Preschool preparation of 1.5–6 years old children according programs of developing education.

- Secondary school specialized in studies of economics and law.

Full general secondary education in economics, law, English language.

== Alumni ==
- Zakharov Vasyl, manager of production finances for regions of Eastern Europe and Middle Asia, Philip Morris International Inc (Switzerland)
- Ostapchuk Kateryna, leading consultant of representative office of Austrian group “Noimann Partners Ukraine”.
- Lashyn Petro, head of the Department of crediting of corporate clients of the Bank “Megabank”.
- Bartian Ivan, director of subsidiary MGF-private Ltd.

== Honorable Doctors ==
- Astakhova Valentyna, Honorary Doctor of the Higher Education Institute of the Academy of pedagogical sciences of Ukraine, Honorary Professor of the International Institute of linguistics and law.
- Astakhova Kateryna, Honorary Doctor of Education Philosophy of Wisconsin International University.

== Awards and reputation ==
- Rating of the Ministry of Education and Science, Youth and Sport of Ukraine.
- Consolidated rating of Ukrainian HEIs.
- International rating Webometrics. 8th place among Kharkiv HEIs. (http://www.webometrics.info )
- Rating of Ukrainian HEIs “Kompas”. PUA is in the TOP-10 of HEIs named by graduates.
