= SCC Arbitration Institute =

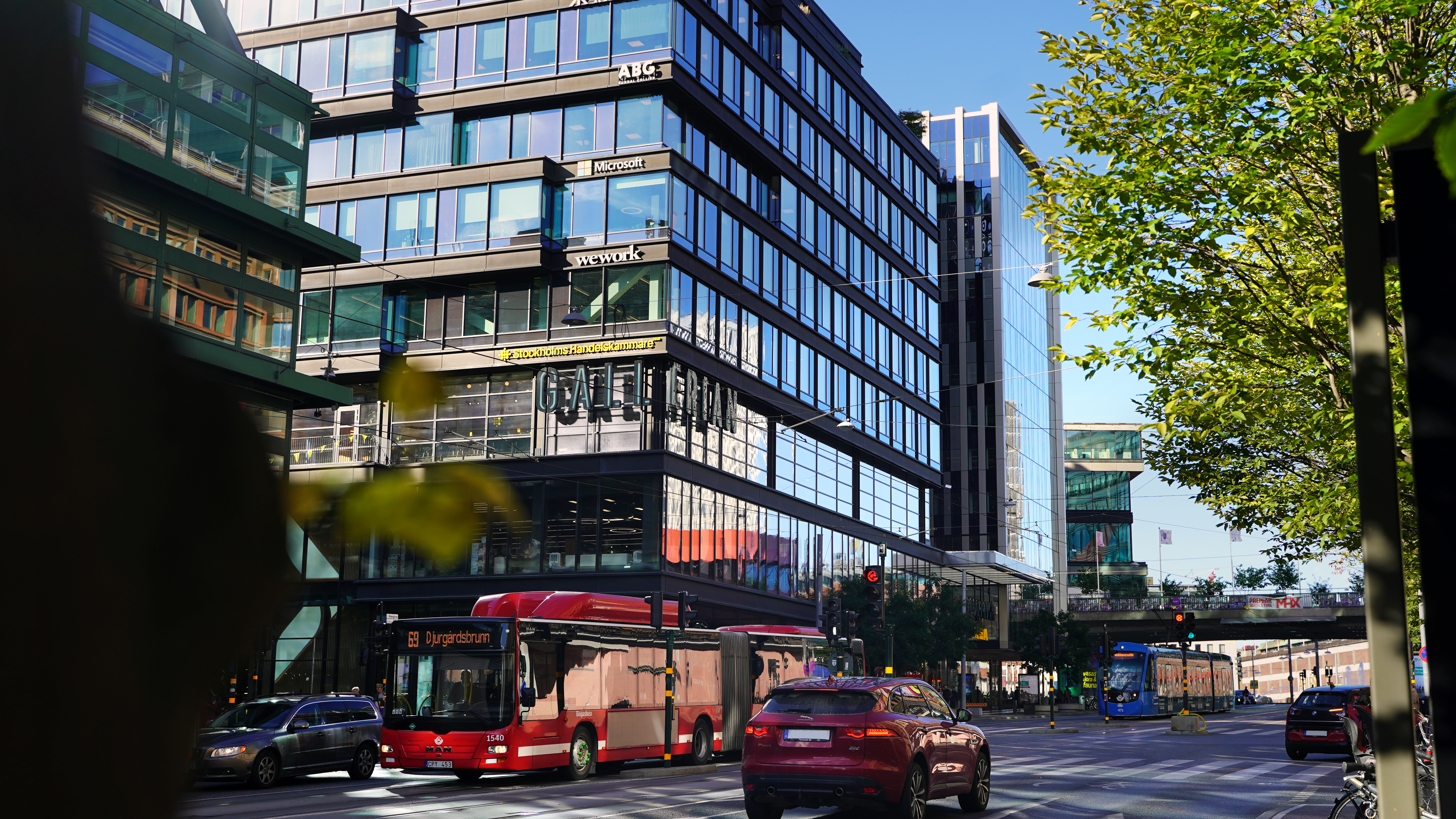
- The building where the SCC Arbitration Institute is headquartered
- Founded: 1917
- Type: International arbitration institute
- Headquarters: Stockholm
- Website: sccarbitrationinstitute.se

The SCC Arbitration Institute (commonly referred to as the SCC) is an independent body for international arbitration and other forms of dispute resolution. It is part of the Stockholm Chamber of Commerce and is based in Stockholm, Sweden. The SCC administers disputes under its own arbitration rules and is involved in both commercial and investor‑state arbitration.

== History ==
The SCC was established in 1917 by the Stockholm Chamber of Commerce to meet the growing demand for a neutral and independent forum for dispute resolution. Its international significance expanded during the Cold War, when it became a preferred venue for resolving trade disputes between parties in the Western and Eastern blocs. Sweden’s political neutrality and the SCC’s impartial framework allowed it to function as a bridge between ideologically divided economies. This role established the SCC’s reputation as a neutral and reliable institution for cross-border disputes. Since then, the SCC has continued to develop its procedures and services in response to evolving global commercial and legal needs.

The SCC registers around 175 to 200 new arbitrations yearly.

== Services ==
The SCC offers a range of dispute resolution mechanisms, including:

- Arbitration: The SCC administers cases under its SCC Arbitration Rules and SCC Expedited Arbitration Rules. Expedited cases take according to statistics approx. up to 6 months to conclude and account for roughly one-third of the SCC’s caseload. The SCC also administers disputes under the UNCITRAL Arbitration Rules.
- Mediation: Mediation is available as an alternative to arbitration, providing parties with a consensual process for dispute resolution.
- SCC Express: Introduced in 2021, SCC Express allows for the resolution of certain disputes within three weeks for a fixed fee. It is particularly suited for long-term contractual relationships.
- Investment Disputes: The SCC is one of the institutions frequently used in investor-state dispute settlement (ISDS), with cases often arising under bilateral investment treaties and international agreements. The SCC has administered more than 130 investment disputes since 1993.

== Governance ==
The SCC is overseen by a Board that is responsible for key decisions such as the appointment of arbitrators, challenges to arbitrators, and issues of prima facie jurisdiction. The Secretariat, led by a Secretary General, manages the administration of cases. Since January 2023, Caroline Falconer serves as the Secretary General, heading a team of 12 employees.

== Administration and technology ==
All cases are administered through the SCC Platform, a digital case management system that is mandatory for all arbitrations conducted under SCC Rules. The platform facilitates secure and efficient communication among parties, arbitrators, and the Secretariat.

== Role in International Arbitration ==
The SCC is considered one of the most established and frequently used arbitration institutions globally. Parties often select the SCC in international contracts due to the SCC’s level of service, and Sweden’s legal infrastructure. Arbitral awards from the SCC are enforced under the New York Convention.

The SCC’s longstanding reputation for neutrality, shaped in part by its role during the Cold War, remains a contributing factor in its continued selection by parties from a wide range of jurisdictions. Today, the SCC administers a wide range of international disputes involving parties from various legal systems and regions. Parties from around 40 to 45 different countries resolve their disputes at the SCC every year. These disputes include both commercial disputes and investor-state arbitrations.

The SCC has handled proceedings under numerous international treaties, such as bilateral investment treaties (BITs) and the Energy Charter Treaty.

The SCC’s caseload reflects a broad international reach, with parties frequently selecting the SCC due to its established procedural framework and reputation for neutrality.

== Notable developments ==
The SCC has administered several prominent disputes, involving both private corporations and sovereign states. It also contributes to international arbitration discourse through publications, seminars, and collaborations with legal professionals worldwide.

== International engagement ==
The SCC maintains an international presence through outreach initiatives, including roadshows, conferences, and dialogue with legal practitioners. Its rules and materials are available in multiple languages, supporting accessibility for users across different jurisdictions.
