= Ukrgasvydobuvannya =

Ukrainian gas company

UkrGasVydobuvannya (UGV)
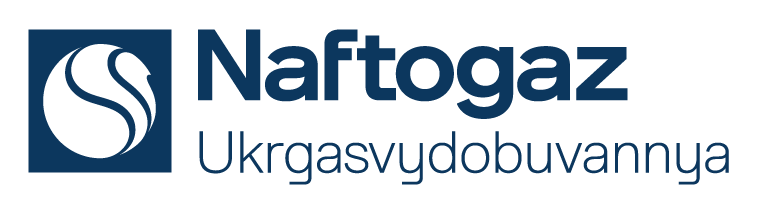

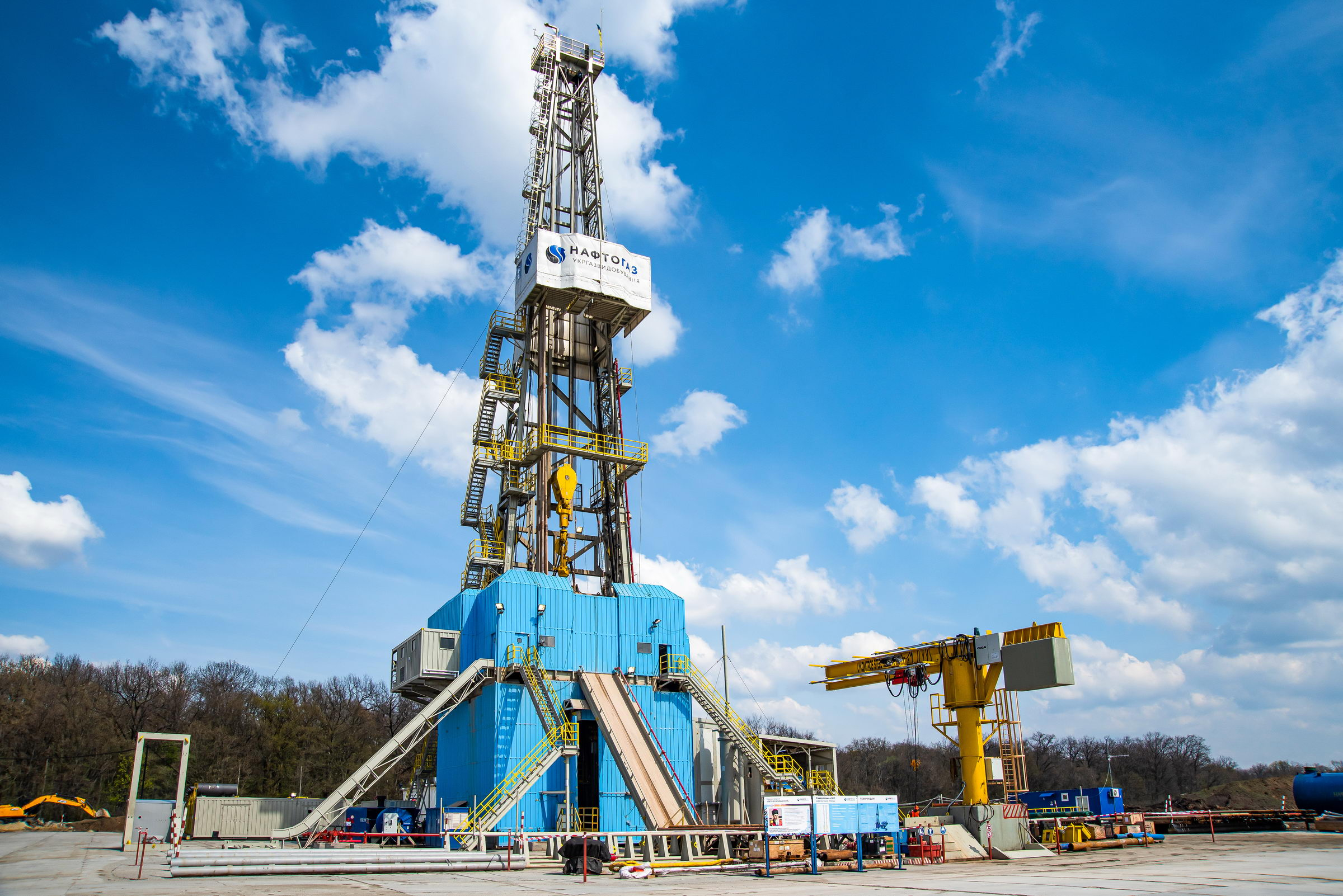
- UkrGasVydobuvannya drilling rig
- Native name: УкрГазВидобування
- Company type: Public joint-stock company
- Industry: Natural-gas processing
- Founded: 1998
- Headquarters: Ukraine, Kyiv
- Key people: Oleg Tolmachev (CEO)
- Services: Exploration of gas and gas condensate reserves
- Revenue: 83,601,901,000 hryvnia (2025)
- Total assets: 296,880,649,000 hryvnia (2025)
- Parent: Naftogaz
- Website: http://www.ugv.com.ua/

The state-owned Public JSC Ukrgasvydobuvannya (Ukrainian: ПАТ "Укргазвидобування") is the largest Ukrainian gas producer. It is a vertically integrated company with a complete production cycle: from exploration of gas and gas condensate reserves, field development, transportation, gas processing and condensate and oil refining to sales.

The company is Ukraine's largest natural gas producer, producing 70% in the country's production.

== History ==
UGV is a subsidiary of a state-owned National Joint-stock company "Naftogaz of Ukraine".

UGV was founded in 1998 by a merger of gas extracting divisions of SC "UkrGasProm" and some other Ukrainian gas extracting companies.

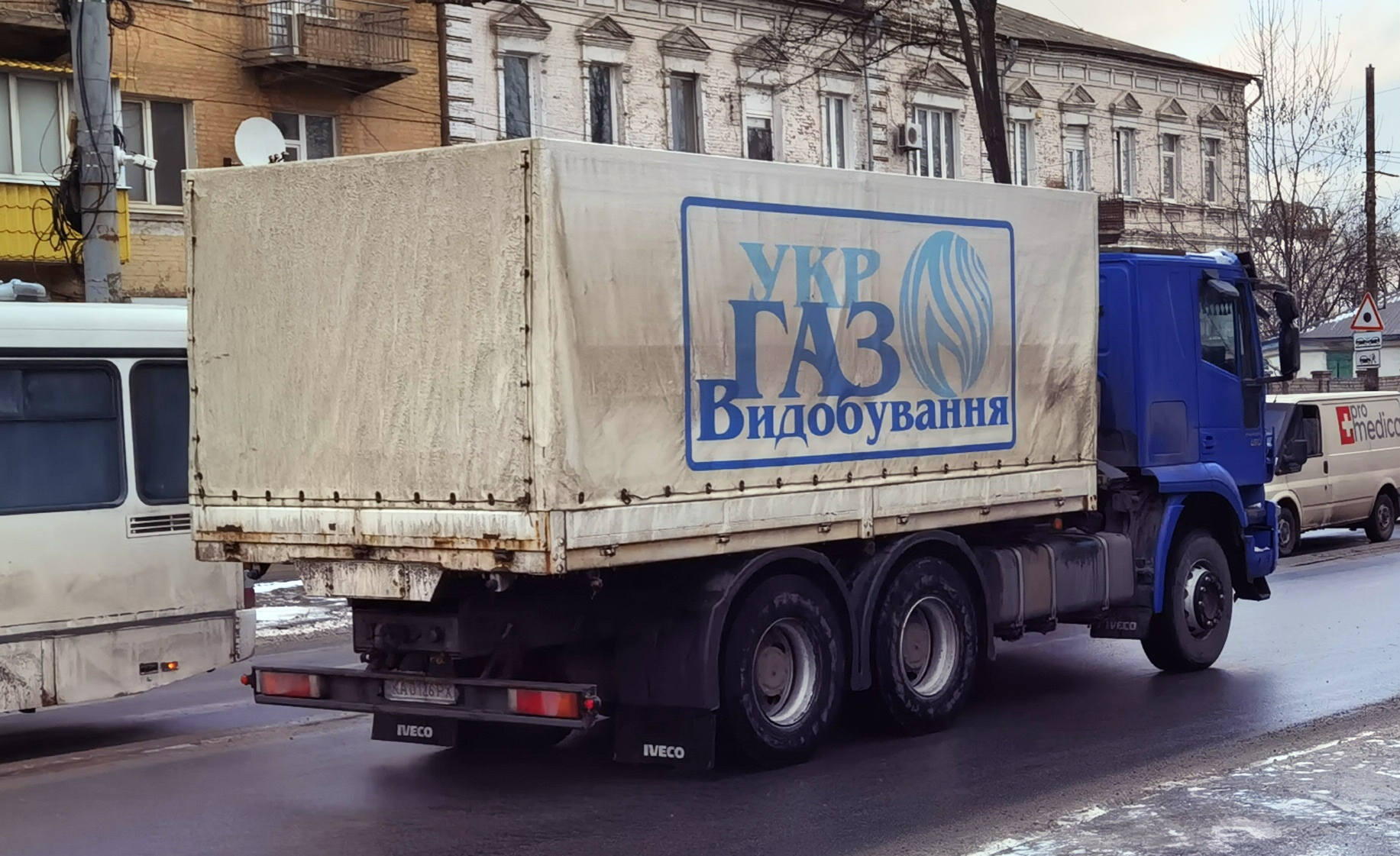
UkrGasVydobuvannya truck in Dnipro.

The National Anti-Corruption Bureau of Ukraine has charged (former member of the Ukrainian parliament) Oleksandr Onyshchenko as the founder and head of a criminal organization, allegedly whose members in the period from January 2013 to June 2016 stole funds during the production and sale of natural gas under joint venture agreements with UkrGasVydobuvannya.

=== Reforms and development ===
In 2015, a new management was appointed in an open competition, which began the process of reforming the company. The Chairman of the Board since June 2015 is Prokhorenko Oleg. As part of the fight against corruption, UkrGasVydobuvannya is one of the leaders in the electronic public procurement system ProZorro.

- 2016: production was stabilized and increased - +47 million m3 in 9 months; the process of modernization of its own fleet of drilling rigs has begun; the practice of outsourcing drilling services has been launched and the market for international companies was opened.
- 2017: the results of this year were achieved through the implementation of an unprecedented campaign to increase natural gas production.
- 2018: the results of the year were completed through the campaign to increase natural gas production at existing fields.
- 2019: the successful production program was launched.
- 2020: the company signed the Ukraine's first-ever product enhancement contract (PEC) facilitated by REDCLIFFE Partners law firm.

At the end of February 2019, UkrGasVydobuvannya entered into an agreement with DeGolyer and MacNaughton Corp. (USA) based on the results of the tender on the assessment of its hydrocarbon reserves, in particular, hydrocarbon reserves of 157 deposits and 49 promising areas with the distribution of priority for further development. The estimated cost is ₴20.25 million.

== Company activities ==
The main areas of activity of the company: prospecting and exploration of oil and gas fields, oil and gas production, transportation of oil and gas, processing of hydrocarbons, sale of oil and gas products. In 2015, the company produced 14.5 bn m3 of gas in 2015, which accounts for 75% of total gas production in Ukraine. It increased natural gas production in 2017 by 4.8%, to 15.25 bcm. UGV also produced more than 20% of all oil and condensate in Ukraine.

In 2016, its subsidiary "Shebelinka Refinery" launched production of Euro 4 and higher standards gasoline (according to European emission standards classification) and Euro 5 Standard diesel fuel.

In April 2016, the company began producing gasoline that meets standards not lower than Euro 4.

In 2019, the company's enterprises extracted 14.892 billion m3 of gas, which is 73% of total production in Ukraine, as well as extracted more than 22% of oil and condensate in Ukraine. The volume of operational and exploratory drilling amounted to 211,6 thousand m.

On August 29, 2023, the company opened a new field with reserves that could reach approximately 1 billion cubic meters of gas. The depth of the field's well is nearly 4,000 meters.

== Company structure ==
- Drilling division “UkrBurGas”
- 3 gas extraction divisions: “PoltavaGasVydobuvannya”, “ShebelynkaGasVydobuvanna” and “LvivGasVydobuvannya”
- Gas and gas condensate refining divisions (Shebelynske and Yablunivske)
- Scientific research center “UkrNDIGas”
- Construction and assembling operations division “Ukrgasspecbudmontazh”
- Center of geophysical research “UkrGasPromGeoPhysics”
- Service company "UGV-Service”
- Specialized emergency rescue service "Likvo”
- Health center “Chervona Ruta”

Areas of extraction include Kharkiv, Poltava, Sumy, Donetsk, Lugansk, Dnipropetrovsk, Lviv, Ivano-Frankivsk, Carpathian Ruthenia and Volynska regions. Exploration activities are carried out in the Dniprovsko-Donetska cavity and the Carpathian Mountains.

According to DeGolyer estimates, as of January 1, 2019, the total reliable and probable gas reserves of JSC UkrGasVydobuvannya are 264.2 billion cubic meters. m, including reliable - 217.3 billion cubic meters and probable - 46.9 billion cubic meters.

In 2020, UkrGasVydobuvannya restored the Abaziv deposit in Poltava region. The flow rate of the well increased from almost zero to 98 thousand m3 per day.

== Oleg Tolmachev ==
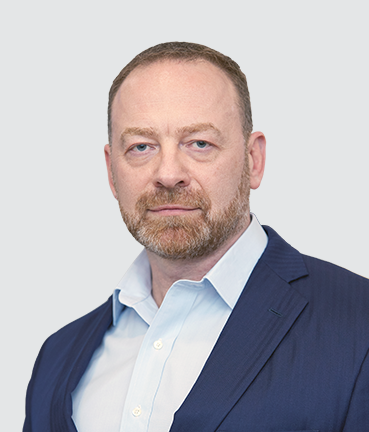
Oleg Tolmachev, Acting CEO of UkrGasVydobuvannya

Oleg Tolmachev (Ukrainian: Олег Євгенійович Толмачев; born January 27, 1975) is Acting Director General of UkrGasVydobuvannya JSC since January, 2023. He graduated from the University of Oklahoma in the United States with a major in Petroleum Engineering. After the graduation, he worked for more than 20 years at gas production companies in the United States (BP America, Chesapeake Energy, EnCana Oil & Gas USA, Eclipse Resources, and Montage Resources), where he held positions of Production and Completion Engineer, Vice-President and Senior Vice-President, Executive Vice-President and Operational Director. In February 2021, Tolmachev was appointed Deputy Director of the Exploration and Production Division at Naftogaz of Ukraine NJSC. In May 2022, he was appointed to the position of director. He managed oil and gas projects in North America for over 20 years.

== See also ==
- Naftogaz
- Natural gas in Ukraine
