= Yuriy Vitrenko =

Ukrainian economist (born 1976)

- Юрій Вітренко
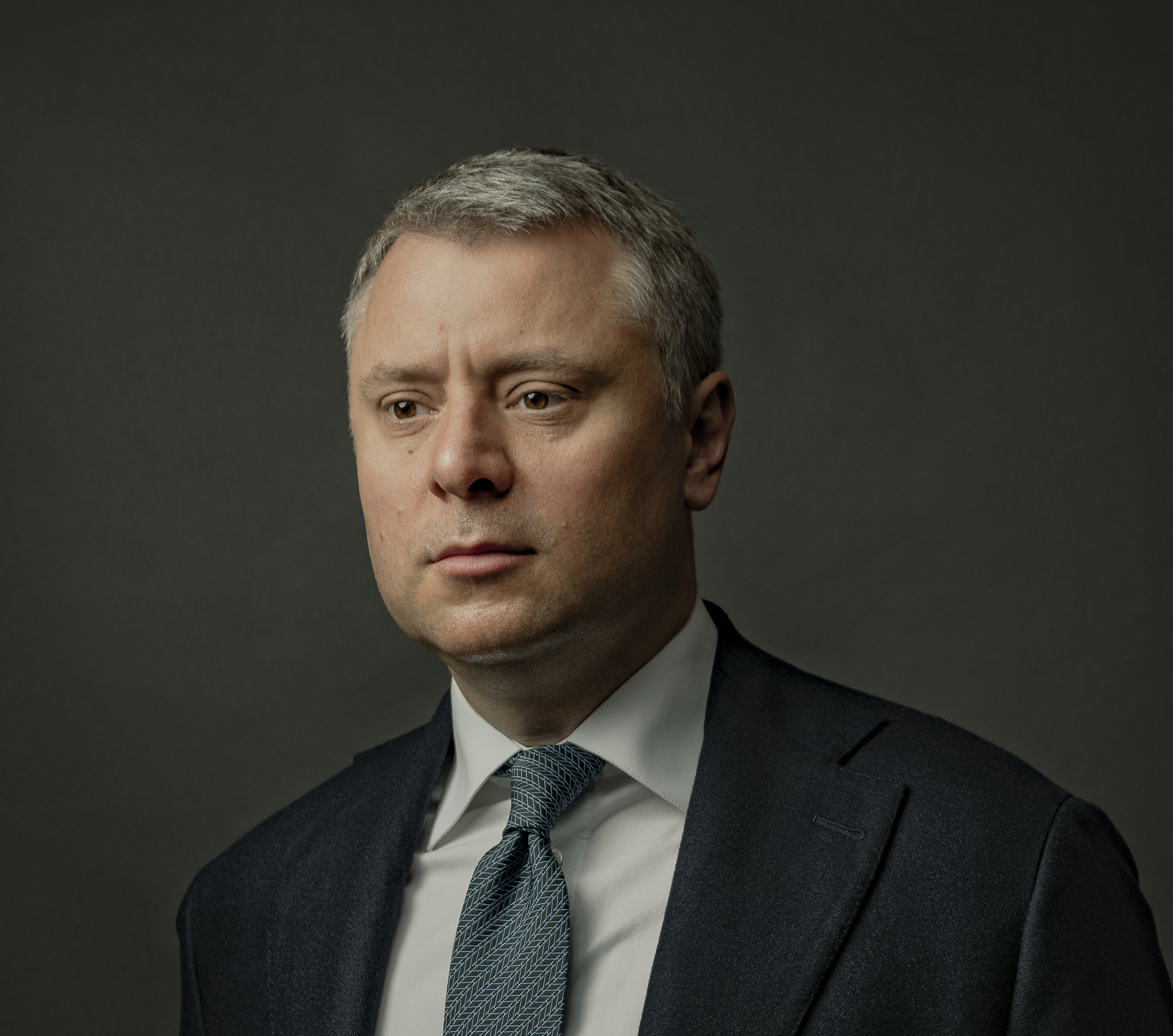
- Vitrenko in 2020

Acting Minister of Energy
- In office 21 December 2020 – 29 April 2021
- Prime Minister: Denys Shmyhal
- Preceded by: Yuriy Boyko (acting)
- Succeeded by: Herman Halushchenko

Personal details
- Born: 17 September 1976 (age 50) Kyiv, Ukrainian SSR, Soviet Union
- Education: INSEAD
- Occupation: Ukrainian businessman

Yuriy Yuriyovych Vitrenko (Ukrainian: Юрій Юрійович Вітренко; born 17 September 1976) is a Ukrainian businessman.

Vitrenko was born and raised in Kyiv before completing his education abroad. He spent his early professional career as a management consultant, investment banker, and private equity manager at international companies in Kyiv and London.

Vitrenko is closely associated with Ukraine's post-2014 energy sector reforms and efforts to enhance the country's energy independence. He played a key role in Naftogaz's landmark multi-billion dollar 2018 international arbitration court victory over Russia's Gazprom and has been a vocal opponent of the Nord Stream II pipeline project. From December 2020 until April 2021, Vitrenko served as Ukraine's Acting Minister of Energy From April 2021 to November 2022 Vitrenko was the CEO of Naftogaz of Ukraine.

== Early life and education ==
Vitrenko was born 17 September 1976 in Kyiv, Ukrainian SSR, Soviet Union. His mother is politician and scientist Nataliya Vitrenko.

Vitrenko graduated from the Faculty of International Economics and Management at Kyiv National Economic University in 1996 and completed a master's degree in International Business Management the following year. He then undertook post-graduate studies at the Department of International Economic Relations at the Kyiv National Taras Shevchenko University's Institute of International Relations.

Following four years of additional international study, Vitrenko was certified by the Association of Chartered Certified Accountants (ACCA) in 2002 before becoming a fellow in 2007. In June 2004, he received an MBA from INSEAD.

== Early career ==
Yuriy Vitrenko began his career with PricewaterhouseCoopers. He then joined Merrill Lynch as an investment banking associate in London[3], before going on to hold the posts of COO and SVP at Amstar Europe, a division of private equity management company Amstar.

Vitrenko is the owner and CEO of AYA Capital and AYA Securities, boutique investment banking, private equity advisory, and securities trading firms[6]. During Ukraine's 2013-2014 Revolution of Dignity, Vitrenko published several papers outlining market reforms for Ukraine together with AYA Research, a research arm of AYA Capital.

Prior to the Revolution of Dignity, Vitrenko served in a number of posts at Naftogaz focusing on company strategy, corporate finance and Russia-Ukraine gas relations at a time when Ukraine was critically dependent on Russian gas.

== Naftogaz (2014–2020) ==
Following the onset of Russian military aggression against Ukraine in February 2014, Vitrenko began serving Naftogaz as an advisor and was soon appointed as a senior executive. Key achievements in this role included freeing Ukraine from dependence on Russian gas imports; transforming Naftogaz from a loss-making enterprise into the biggest net contributor to the Ukrainian state budget; improving corporate governance in line with OECD guidelines; facilitating the development of a liberalized wholesale gas market; and securing two landmark victories over Russia's Gazprom in international arbitration proceedings. According to Upstream, Vitrenko was “at the forefront of the company's legal battles with Gazprom.”

Securing transportation capacities and alternative gas supplies from the EU were top priorities in summer 2014 after Russia halted deliveries of gas to Ukraine. This was achieved by unlocking the Slovak inter connector and signing a breakthrough contract with Norwegian gas producer Statoil (currently Equinor). This was widely viewed as a significant step toward securing Ukraine's energy independence.

Vitrenko was a key figure in a long-running arbitration battle between Naftogaz and Gazprom from 2014 to 2018 that was recognized as the world's largest ever commercial arbitration case. The Russian company's claims were close to Ukraine's GDP and thus represented a major strategic threat not only to Naftogaz but to the country as a whole. A series of favorable verdicts delivered by the Arbitration Institute in Stockholm in 2017-18 saved Ukraine $81.4 billion in damages while awarding Naftogaz $4.6 billion for Gazprom's failure to deliver contracted transit volumes.

Following arbitration success, Vitrenko negotiated a new gas transit contract for 2020-2014 directly with Russian President Vladimir Putin during a December 2019 summit meeting in Paris. “My personal experience in dealing with Putin is that you can only make him do the right thing if you are prepared to confront Russia,” Vitrenko commented following talks in the French capital.“They only understand strong positions in negotiations, so unless you are ready to show that you have a strong position [and] you prepare in advance, you have no chance to win against Putin.”

Some Ukrainian politicians were critical of the new gas transit deal with Russia, while many of Ukraine's partners including the US offered public congratulations.

In 2019, the Naftogaz gas transit business unit headed by Vitrenko reported record profits. Vitrenko was also widely credited by reform observers such as the Atlantic Council with leading reform and restructuring efforts within Naftogaz. Many of the reforms adopted in the years following 2014 proved controversial within Ukraine while being applauded by the country's Western partners.

During this period, Vitrenko held the number two position at Naftogaz but was widely perceived as the driving force behind the company's modernization. Ukrainian Prime Minister Volodymyr Groisman named Vitrenko the “mastermind” behind the transformation of Naftogaz with CEO Andriy Kobolev serving as a figurehead.

Prior to being appointed CEO of Naftogaz, Kobolev had worked at AYA Capital, owned and headed by Vitrenko. Vitrenko has since maintained that he and Kobolev entered into a gentlemen's agreement in 2014 stating that they would be equal partners in the management of Naftogaz. However, by the end of 2018, the first signs of a rift between the two were becoming apparent, with Vitrenko moving from his position as Group Chief Operating Officer to Executive Director focusing on the gas transit business and relations with Gazprom.

Internal tensions mounted within Naftogaz during 2019 over the implementation of a transformation plan developed by Vitrenko's team. In early 2020, Vitrenko criticized Kobolev in front of the Naftogaz supervisory board. In April 2020, Vitrenko was released from his post. He claims his departure was due to his uncompromising stance on corruption and his approach to relations with Gazprom, which allegedly created issues for the Ukrainian government in their negotiations with Russia over the ongoing conflict in eastern Ukraine. "They don't want me because I'm stubborn. I talk too much. I upset Gazprom,"! Vitrenko said in an interview with the Kyiv Post. “I upset this 'peace process' that they have. It's that simple.”

Naftogaz reported a quarterly loss after Vitrenko's departure and remained loss-making until his return as CEO in 2021. Vitrenko, Kobolev and members of the Naftogaz the supervisory board have continued to exchange criticism via the media.

On 28 April 2021, the Cabinet of Ministers of Ukraine appointed Vitrenko as Chairman of the Board of Naftogaz for one year and on 26 April 2022 The Cabinet of Ministers of Ukraine extended the powers of Yuri Vitrenko as Chairman of the Board of Naftogaz of Ukraine until April 29, 2023.

== Acting Ukrainian Minister of Energy (2020–21) ==
In the final months of 2020, Vitrenko was invited to serve as Ukraine's Minister of Energy. At the time, he was being widely tipped as a potential future prime minister. His candidacy as energy minister was blocked by MPs reputedly linked to Ukrainian oligarchs with interests in the energy sector including Firtash, Akhmetov, and Kolomoiskiy according to some. This obstruction helped drive government efforts to pursue policies of deoligarchization. Facing obstacles in parliament, the Cabinet of Ministers appointed Vitrenko as Acting Minister of Energy. He remained in this post until his appointment as Naftogaz CEO in April 2021.

As Ukraine's Acting Energy Minister, Vitrenko addressed the risk of blackouts due to record low coal reserves and delayed maintenance of Ukraine's nuclear power plants. Ukraine managed to avoid blackouts by securing controversial electricity imports from Belarus. Vitrenko was also criticised for his statement about the need to submit a complaint to the EU competition authority in order to force Gazprom to allow exports of natural gas by Russian producers independent from Gazprom, which was interpreted as an attempt to resume direct Russian gas imports to Ukraine.

Rapid increases in retail prices on the recently deregulated gas market sparked widespread public protests in early 2021. Arguing that market price fluctuations reflected abuses by dominant players including Gazprom and regional providers, Vitrenko advocated regulation. The Ukrainian authorities instead opted for a temporary price cap based on a proposal from Naftogaz management.

Vitrenko's time in ministerial office witnessed steps toward the deoligarchization of the energy sector. Igor Kolomoiskiy lost informal control over Zenterenergo, while Dmytro Firtash suffered setbacks in the retail gas market. Vitrenko made integration into the EU electricity market a strategic priority for Ukraine.

== CEO of Naftogaz (2021–2022) ==
Yuriy Vitrenko was appointed CEO of Naftogaz in April 2021. He was the first Naftogaz CEO with an extensive international professional background including an MBA from INSEAD Business School and roles at a number of leading global companies. Vitrenko was able to reverse the losses reported by Naftogaz in 2020 and return the company to profitability in 2021. Gas production also increased in 2021, ending a recent downward trend.

Vitrenko identified his priorities as putting Naftogaz's modernization back on track by implementing international standards and becoming a driver of market reforms. The previous management of Naftogaz and the supervisory board were critical of the measures adopted by Vitrenko, as were a number of Ukrainian politicians.

Even before his appointment as Naftogaz CEO, Vitrenko was a prominent international advocate of tougher sanctions policies toward Russia including sanctions on the Nord Stream II pipeline project, which he warned would have major geopolitical implications if allowed to enter into service. He was also a vocal supporter of Ukraine’s Euro-Atlantic integration and the further reform of the Ukrainian gas sector with a view to moving toward national energy security and sustainable development.

Following his appointment as Naftogaz CEO, Vitrenko continued to call for a firmer international approach toward Russia and tougher sanctions on the Russian energy sector. He has also played an active role in the national debate within Ukraine over the country’s post-war recovery. Vitrenko is a member of The National Council for the Recovery of Ukraine and a member of The International Working Group on Russian Sanctions, where he is responsible for advising on energy issues.

=== Russian invasion and dismissal ===
During the first six months following the beginning of Russia's full-scale invasion of Ukraine on 24 February 2022, Naftogaz increased its share Ukraine's overall tax revenues to one-third. Vitrenko remained at his post in the Ukrainian capital during the Battle of Kyiv in the first months of the invasion. A significant amount of Naftogaz assets were destroyed by the Russian military during the first six months of the invasion while a number of company employees were killed. Many more Naftogaz employees joined the Ukrainian military but the company managed to maintain stability in key business processes.

Managing Naftogaz as Ukraine defended itself against the largest European invasion since World War II has proved hugely challenging. An article in Canada's The Globe and Mail stated that Vitrenko may have “the toughest job in the world.”

According to a separate article in Bloomberg, “Vitrenko has been among top managers in Naftogaz for most of the period since 2014, when Russia cut off gas supplies to 'domestic market. Now he leads the company as Russian troops are targeting Ukrainian towns and cities, affecting gas supplies to the civilian population, though the Kremlin is cautious to preserve pipelines and pumping stations used to carry Russian gas through Ukraine to European customers.”

Upstream reported that Vitrenko “has shown great strength of character as the Ukrainian state oil and gas company continues to operate during the country's war with Russia. Even before the Russian invasion, Vitrenko had been a bulwark for Naftogaz guiding the producer and distributor through disputes with Russian gas giant Gazprom and domestic gas market reforms.”

The Cabinet of Ministers dismissed Vitrenko as CEO of Naftogaz on 1 November 2022 at his own request (his last working day was 3 November 2022).

== Personal life ==
Yuriy Vitrenko is a keen sportsman and football fan. As a child, he attended the Dynamo Kyiv Academy.
