= Moscow State Mining University =

Educational institute in Russia

Coordinates: 55.7272°N 37.607°E

- Московский государственный горный университет
- Established: September 4th, 1918
- Location: Moscow, Russia
- Website: http://www.msmu.ru or http://www.mggu.ru

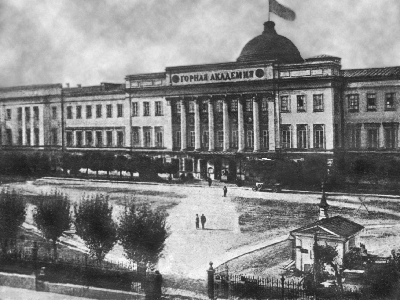
Moscow State Mining University ("International Journal of Refractory Metals and Hard Materials" 49)

Moscow State Mining University (Russian: Московский государственный горный университет) is a Russian institute of higher education that prepares mining engineers. In 2014, the university merged with the National University of Science and Technology MISiS and became a part of it as the Moscow Mining Institute (College of Mining).

== History ==
Its history can be traced back to September 4, 1918, when Moscow Mining Academy was founded.

There was a task in the USSR - to prepare 435,000 engineers and technicians in 5 years (1930-1935) during the USSR industrialization period, while their number in 1929 was 66,000.

In 1930 the Moscow Mining Academy was divided into six independent institutes by the order of Supreme Soviet of the National Economy. Among the new colleges which grew out of the academy's departments was Moscow Mining Institute. In 1993 the Institute was transformed into the State University of Mining.

Since 2014, the university is a part of the National University of Science and Technology MISiS.

== Education ==
A multi-level structure of higher education has been introduced at the university. The first four years of university study are known as undergraduate study and usually lead to the Bachelor of Science (B.Sc.) degree. All bachelor's programs include general education in science and engineering, social sciences, arts, and a field of specialization called the major.

The second level, five years together with the first level, may lead to receiving a diploma of a chartered mining engineer. The objective of the program is to give high level specialized training to engineers. A professionally qualified mining engineer must be a graduate proficient in technical management as well as in practical knowledge of actual mining operations.

Students who have excelled as undergraduates may wish to continue their education at the graduate level (the third level). Upon conclusion of two additional years at the university, the student will be awarded the Master of Science (M.Sc.) degree.

== Calendar ==
The academic year is divided into 17-week terms called autumn and spring semesters. Towards the end of the second year the student is expected to select his field of specialization. After graduating from the university students may specialize in underground or surface mining, geology and surveying, mineral processing, mining economics and management, ecology and environmental engineering, computing and computer programming, etc.

== Departments ==
Six faculties (departments) of the university are currently training over 5,000 undergraduate students and about 300 postgraduates. The faculties of the University are:

- The Faculty of Coal Mining and Underground Construction
- The Faculty of Ore and Non-Ore Mining
- The Faculty of Physical Engineering
- The Faculty of Mining Electrical Mechanics
- The Faculty of Automation and Computer Science
- The Faculty of Evening and Correspondence Education.

The university has at its disposal research and laboratory facilities, automation and computer systems, recreation centers, hostels and sports facilities. There is a Lyceum for high-school students (9-10 grades) and a preparatory department. Moscow State University of Mining takes orders for conducting research and development. The university has a publishing house of its own. There is a military training department.

Categories of graduates: Bachelor of Science, Mining Engineer, Master of Science, Candidate of Science, Doctor of Science.

Specialties: computer-aided information and control systems; blasting; mining machinery and equipment; environmental engineering; surveying; management; mineral processing; open pit mining; underground mining; computer-aided design systems; mechanical engineering; technology of artistic decoration of engineering materials; control and information in engineering systems; physical processes of mining production; construction of mines and underground structures; economy and management of mines and geological prospecting enterprises; economy of nature management; electrical engineering and automation of industrial installations and technological systems; power supply of mining enterprises.

== Notable faculty ==
- Vadym Kopylov (b. 1958), Ukrainian statesman
- Georgi Mondzolevski (b. 1934), Soviet Olympic and world champion volleyball player
- Alexander Pavlovitch Serebrovsky (1884-1938), reformer of Soviet gold mining industry

== Notable alumni ==
- Dmytro Salamatin- Ukrainian politician
- Trần Hồng Hà - Vietnamese Deputy Prime Minister
