= Unbundling =

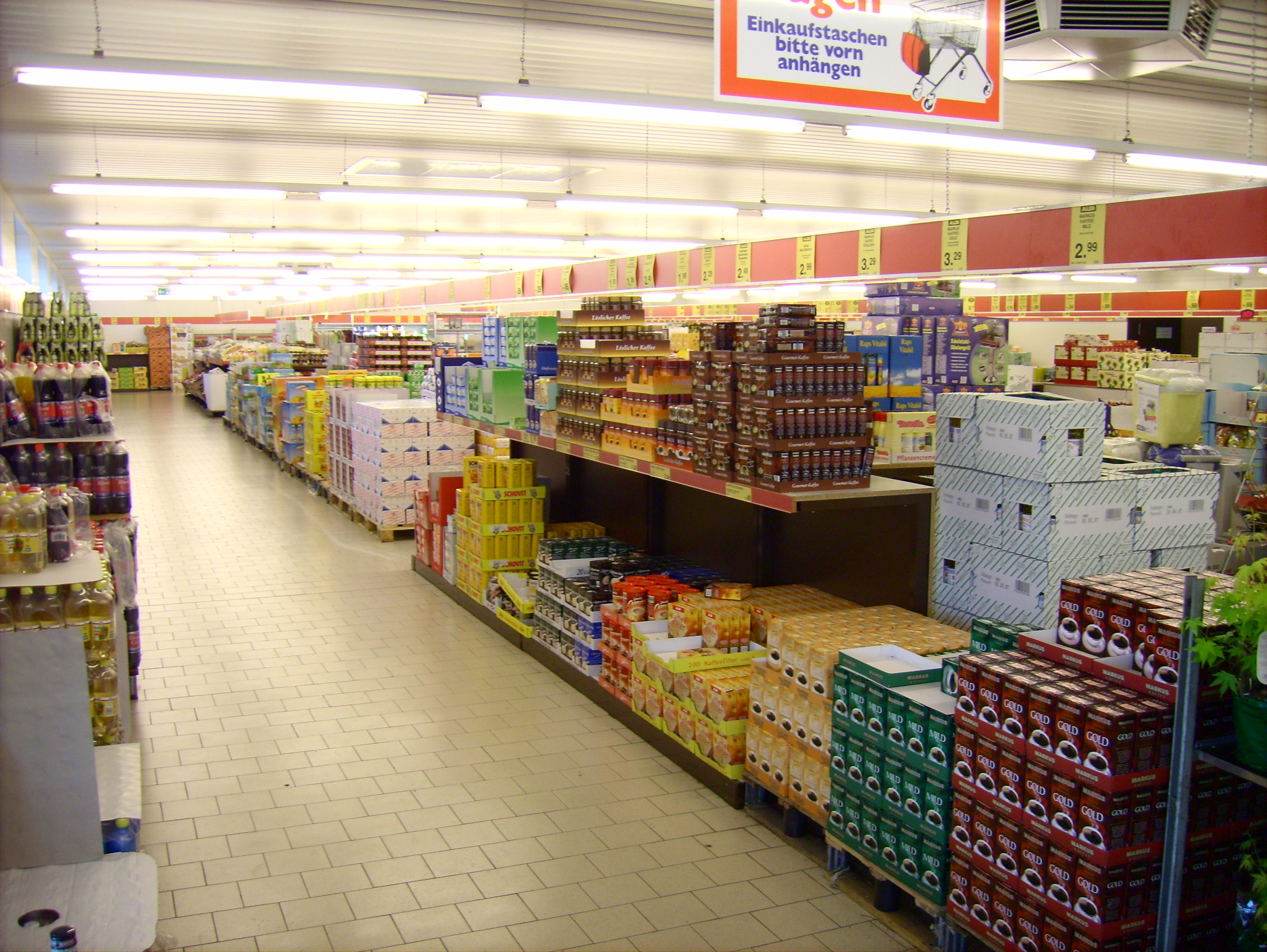
While many examples of unbundling involve digital services, there are legacy businesses that have found ways to use this strategy, including Aldi, a no frills grocery chain which strips away many elements of a typical grocery store to offer lower prices. The stores have no butcher services, deli counter, bakery, or background music, and they offer a smaller selection than a typical grocery store, and products are often in their shipping boxes.

Unbundling is the process of breaking up packages of products and services that were previously offered as a group and making them individually purchaseable. It may also involve taking products that were formerly distributed for free, such as software, and making them purchaseable. Unbundling has been called "the great disruptor" of existing business models, as competitors who start to sell individual components of a service that was traditionally bundled by incumbent firms can gain customers who want more choices or lower cost. Unbundling elements of a package and making them available separately and giving consumers more choices are generally processes that are seen as favourable to customers. For example, a cellphone service provider which formerly sold cellphones and cellphone services as a package may begin to provide the cellular service as a standalone item.

== Etymology ==
"Unbundling" means the "process of breaking apart something into smaller parts".

== Examples ==
- While higher education was traditionally made available as a package of services, including tuition, fees for student services and amenities, and, in some cases, dormitory housing and meals, with Massive open online courses (MOOC), the components of higher education are unbundled into parts MOOC provide online access to recorded lectures, online tests, and digital documents as a complement to traditional classroom instruction. Online program management providers are also increasingly unbundling services in higher education, which some argue "reflects increasing sophistication—and capacity—of colleges and universities as they launch new online programs."
- Software unbundling: some IBM computer software "products" were once distributed "free" (no charge for the software itself, a common practice early in the industry). The term "Program Product" was used by IBM to denote that it is a chargeable item.
- Pandora Radio
- Broadcast rights unbundling in college football: The addition of Maryland and Rutgers to the Big Ten Conference was described as part of a larger trend towards the unbundling of each university's broadcast rights to maintain profitability.
- Online news unbundling: In 2013, the CEO of Mashable predicted that unbundled news contents' "microcontent sharing" via software like Flipboard (Android and iOS), Zite and Spun (iPhone) would be a major trend in 2013.
- Job website unbundling: In 2014, the LinkedIn jobs website, which initially had one website, moved to an unbundling multi-app strategy, which split into a family of six separate apps, the LinkedIn "Mothership" app and 'satellite' apps ranging from job search to tailored job news.
- Residential Internet unbundling: customers who live in large apartment complexes and multiple dwelling units can be unbundled in a way that allows multiple Internet service providers to reach each of the different units.
- While hotels have traditionally offered a bundle of services, including a bed, living room area, and private bathroom, with capsule hotels, which offer stacked bed-sized pods, hotel firms are “stripping down [hotel] service in order to offer the lowest price possible.”

== See also ==
- Information Age
- Creative destruction
- Disruptive innovation
- Asset stripping
- Leapfrogging
- List of emerging technologies
- Obsolescence
- Paradigm shift
- Technology strategy
- Killer application
