= Sean Carr =

Sean Carr may refer to:

- Sean Carr (1968–2018), rock musician. Spouses: Mary Hill (married 2013–2018) and Yevhenia Tymoshenko, (married 2005–2011) daughter of Ukrainian politician Yulia Tymoshenko Sean was the lead singer with his own band that originated from Leeds called DVS or Death Valley Screamers
- Sean D. Carr, Director of Corporate Innovation Programs at the Batten Institute at the University of Virginia
