= Oleksandr Tymoshenko =

Ukrainian businessman

- Олександр Тимошенко

Spouse of the Prime Minister of Ukraine
- In role 18 December 2007 – 4 March 2010
- Prime Minister: Yulia Tymoshenko
- Preceded by: Lyudmyla Yanukovych
- Succeeded by: Hanna Turchynova (acting)
- In role 24 January 2005 (Note: Acting: 24 January 2005 – 4 February 2005) – 8 September 2005
- Prime Minister: Yulia Tymoshenko
- Preceded by: Lyudmyla Azarova (acting)
- Succeeded by: Olena Yekhanurova

Personal details
- Born: Oleksandr Hennadiiovych Tymoshenko; 11 June 1960 (age 66) Dnipropetrovsk, Ukrainian SSR, Soviet Union (now Dnipro, Ukraine)
- Spouse: Yulia Tymoshenko (m. 1979)
- Children: Eugenia Tymoshenko
- Parent: Hennady Tymoshenko
- Education: Oles Honchar Dnipro National University
- Occupation: Businessman

Oleksandr Hennadiiovych Tymoshenko (Ukrainian: Олекса́ндр Генна́дійович Тимоше́нко; born 11 June 1960) is the husband of former Ukrainian prime minister Yulia Tymoshenko and a businessman. Tymoshenko owns an egg farm and is the founder of two companies producing equipment for medical institutions. According to his wife, Tymoshenko only does business outside Ukraine "after all the events that took place in Ukraine" and owns a construction business.

== Biography ==
Oleksandr was the son of a mid-level Communist Party official, Hennady Tymoshenko. According to The Times, he met Yulia Telegina when he misdialed her number. He called back and they eventually agreed to meet and quickly fell in love. The pair were married in 1979 in Dnipropetrovsk, Ukraine, and have a daughter, Yevhenia (Eugenia) (b. 1980).

On 18 August 2000 Oleksandr, a (along with his father Hennadiy Tymoshenko) board member of the United Energy Systems of Ukraine (UESU) Corporation (of which Yulia was general director), was arrested along with the company's managing director, Valery Falkovich. He was charged with embezzling $800,000 in public funds and forging customs documents to import gas from Russia – all based on activities from the 1990s. The following March, he was transferred to a Zhytomyr Oblast jail so as to avoid communication between Oleksandr, Falkovich (who was transferred to a Chernihiv jail at that time) and Yulia, who by that time was also under arrest. On 8 August 2001, Russian prosecutors handed over information to Ukrainian officials implicating Yulia and Oleksandr in customs violations. The following day, a Kyiv district court released Oleksandr and Falkovich due to lack of evidence. The prosecutor's office, however, appealed the ruling and continued the case against Oleksandr, leading him to spend two years in hiding to avoid prosecution on charges he and his wife say are trumped up. In another ruling, the Kyiv district court ruled the charges against Oleksandr "groundless." Charges were finally dropped in May 2002. Tymoshenko's father-in-law has also been arrested in connecting with this case, he was released in 2003. According to Mrs. Tymoshenko her spouse has never been personally involved with the Yulia Tymoshenko Bloc.

In December 2010, Tymoshenko was admitted to hospital, according to Oleksandr Turchynov, "in rather grave condition".

Tymoshenko appears very rarely with his wife in public and never gives interviews and does not publicly comment on the work of his wife and their personal life. Tymoshenko's hypocorism for her husband is "Sasha".

Early January 2012 Tymoshenko was granted asylum in the Czech Republic that he had requested at the end of the previous year. He stated that the "decision was made so that we should not give the authorities additional opportunities to exert pressure on my wife". He also claimed he could not return to Ukraine because he would be immediately arrested upon arrival. Since 2000 Tymoshenko owned 33% share of International Industrial Projects, s.r.o., a small company in Ústí nad Labem. The company did not have any web presence and no contact could be found on the internet. It failed to publish information mandated by the Czech law and was liquidated in February 2012. Tymoshenko also has lasting contacts with several top Czech politicians. It was alleged that he had owned a house in Lidice since 2000, but he denied this accusation in a post in his wife's blog, stating that his asylum in the Czech Republic was temporary. On 24 February 2014, just after the "Maidan revolution" and his wife's release from prison, he returned to Ukraine.

== See also ==
- Family of Yulia Tymoshenko
