= Kateryna Zagoriy =

Ukrainian philanthropist (born 1978)

- Катерина Загорій
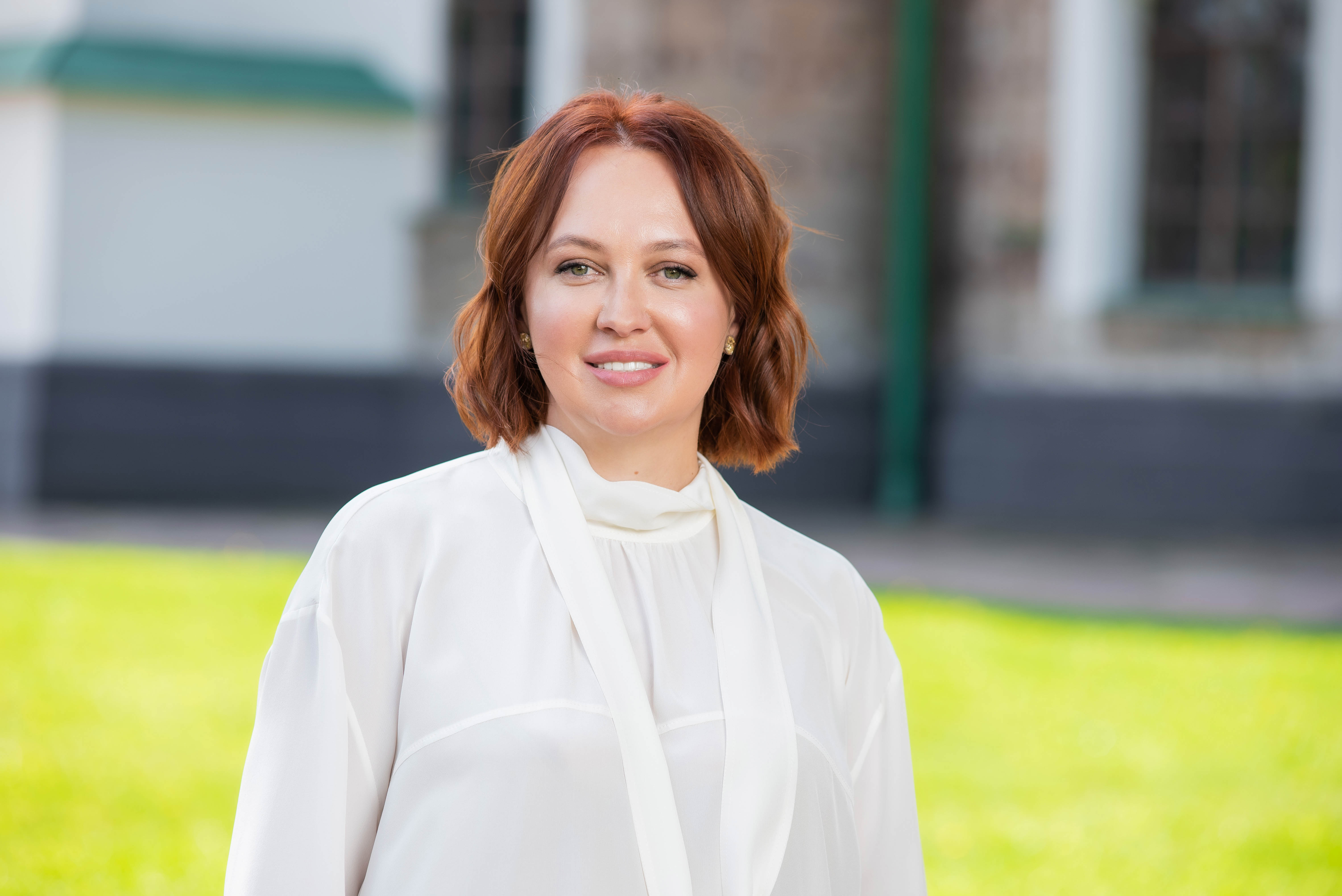
- Pronunciation: [kɐterˈɪnɐ zɐɡorˈʲj]
- Born: Kateryna Kotenko; July 6, 1978 (age 48); Lviv, (Ukraine)
- Education: University of Lviv
- Known for: National Council of Television and Radio Broadcasting of Ukraine Secretary
- Board member of: Zagoriy Foundation
- Spouse: Glib Zagoriy

Kateryna Serhiivna Zagoriy (Ukrainian: Катери́на Сергі́ївна Загорі́й; born July 6, 1978, Lviv) is a Ukrainian media expert, philanthropist, former secretary of the National Council of Television and Radio Broadcasting of Ukraine, co-founder of the Zagoriy Foundation.

Kateryna Zagoriy took position No. 73 in the ranking of 100 Most Influential Women of Ukraine published by "Focus" magazine in 2018. In 2020, according to the version of the "Journal NV" ("NV Magazine") Kateryna Zagoriy takes 37th position in the Top 100 Successful Women of Ukraine (or No. 5 in the nomination "Society").

== Biography ==
=== Education ===
In 2000, Kateryna Zagoriy graduated from the Department of Economics of the Ivan Franko National University of Lviv, where she studied sociology and received the specialty of "The sociologist; The teacher of sociology".

In 2008, Kateryna became a graduate of Aspen Institute Kyiv and in 2009 she graduated the Ukrainian School of Political Studies of the Summer University for Democracy of the Council of Europe.

=== Activity ===
Professional activity

During 2005–2014, Kateryna Zagoriy worked as the executive director of the Industrial Television Committee (Kyiv). According to "Focus", by 2010, Kateryna had become the main defender of the Ukrainian television business.

In 2014–2016, she was a member and executive secretary of the National Council of Television and Radio Broadcasting of Ukraine.

Since 2016, Kateryna has been a member of the Supervisory Board of the Zagoriy Foundation (Zagoriy Family Foundation).

Public activity

Since 2002, Kateryna Zagoriy has been a permanent member of various public councils, working groups and expert colleges in the field of television and radio broadcasting and media management. She was a member of the expert jury of international television competitions and festivals, such as: Banff, TEFI Commonwealth and Impact Awards.

Charity activity

In 2015, Kateryna Zagoriy, together with Glib and Volodymyr Zagoriy, founded the Zagoriy Family Foundation (Zagoriy Foundation). It acts to systematically implement charitable projects (primarily aimed at developing a culture of charitable giving).

In 2018, Kateryna Zagoriy became one of the initiators of the Ukrainian version of the global movement Giving Tuesday (originated in the USA), which was first held on 27 November 2018.

Since spring 2022, she has participated in the delivery of humanitarian and medical aid to the de-occupied territories of Kyiv Oblast, Kharkiv Oblast, and Kherson Oblast. She also oversees the Zagos Farm social farm, according to media reports.

She is involved in projects focused on the care and adoption of stray animals and founded the Varangian Dogs&Cats Adoption Center in Yaremche.

=== Family status ===
Kateryna Zagoriy is married to Glib Zagoriy and has a son.

== Ratings ==
100 Most Influential Women of Ukraine by "Focus" magazine:

- 2010 — 88th position;
- 2017 — 53rd position;
- 2018 — 73rd position.

Top 100 successful women of Ukraine of the "NV Magazine" publication in 2020 — 37th position.
