= Child.ua =

Ukrainian children's rights organization

Association of International and All-Ukrainian Public Organizations CHILD.UA
- Дитина
- Formation: 1999; 27 years ago
- Founder: Eugenia Tymoshenko
- Type: Non-governmental organization
- Location: Kyiv, Ukraine
- Head: Eugenia Tymoshenko
- Website: child.ua

Child.ua (Ukrainian: Дитина, romanized: Dytyna, pronounced [dɪˈtɪnɐ]) is a Ukrainian non-profit community organization that has united the efforts of a number of public and charitable organizations in the protection of children's rights, assistance to children with special needs, volunteer battalions and families of immigrants, and the development of creative youth. The association is included in the register of the National Social Service of Ukraine, which involves volunteers, including foreigners, in its activities.

Eugenia Tymoshenko founded and heads the organization.

== History ==
The organization was created in 1999, when an initiative group to help children who found themselves on the street began its activities. In 2004, this initiative group formed the International Charitable Organization "Poglyad".

In 2011, the all-Ukrainian public organization "All-Ukrainian Center of Social Adaptation for Youth", the international public organization "Towards the Dream" and the international public organization "Territory of Childhood" united and founded the Union of Citizens' Associations of the Association of International and All-Ukrainian Public Organizations "Social Protection" . In February 2018, the name was changed to the Association of International and All-Ukrainian Public Organizations "Child".

Every year, the Association holds about 30 charity events and helps 3,000 children.

As of 2022, the Association includes: public organization "Planet of Warm Hearts "Danko", international charity fund "Life with excess", international public organization "Zhyvy", international charity fund "View", all-Ukrainian charity organization "Heart of the Batkivshchyna", international charity "Time to Serve" Fund.

== Mission and purpose ==
The mission is to raise standards and implement children's rights in accordance with the UN Convention on the Rights of the Child.

The goal is to promote the comprehensive development of children who find themselves in difficult life circumstances, to provide them with opportunities and skills to create a better future for themselves and their families.

The main activities of the Association:

- improvement of legislation in the field of child protection;
- social protection of children and families who find themselves in difficult life circumstances;
- volunteer movement;
- creative development of children in residential institutions;
- charity.

== Activity ==
The association was the organizer, co-organizer, founder and sponsor of numerous events, projects, conferences, etc., including: the festival "Toward the Dream", the volunteer movement "Voice of Peace", "Autism Friendly Space", the international conference on autism problems "Opening the door", charity football match "Parliamentary Cup" between the national team of people's deputies and the national team of journalists of Ukraine.

In October 2015, the Department of Economic and Social International Affairs of the United Nations accredited the "CHILD.UA" Association and entered it into the database of all accredited public organizations "Civil Society".

In the fall of 2018, the Association cooperated with the Real Madrid Foundation (a non-profit humanitarian organization founded by the Real Madrid football club), which organized the first football class for Ukrainian children in Odesa.

On 12 March 2019, representatives of the association handed over special equipment for the Center for Helping Children with Autism.

In 2020, composer and pianist Yevhen Khmara, together with the Association, presented an album for children with autism. In the same year, the Association received a grant from the Zagoriy Foundation to implement the Autism Friendly Space program for training dentists and hairdressers to work with people with autism. The amount of the grant was UAH 193,000.

In the summer of 2021, the Association, in cooperation with the Kyiv City Council's standing committee on health issues, launched a pilot inclusive project in Kyiv children's camps with the aim of ensuring the comfortable recovery of children in need of special conditions.

In September 2022, the Ministry of Education and Science of Ukraine, together with the Association and other public organizations and state institutions, developed methodological recommendations for educational institutions "Using methods of alternative and additional communication in educational institutions".
