= Darnytsia (company) =

Ukrainian pharmaceutical company

- Trade name: Darnytsia
- Native name: Дарниця
- Type: Private
- Industry: Pharmaceutical industry
- Predecessor: Kyiv branch of the Ukrainian Institute of Experimental Endocrinology; Darnitsa Chemical and Pharmaceutical Plant; Kyiv industrial chemical and pharmaceutical association Darnitsa; Collective enterprise Pharmaceutical firm Darnitsa; CJSC Pharmaceutical Firm Darnitsa
- Headquarters: Kyiv, Ukraine
- Key people: Volodymyr Zagoriy; Glib Zagoriy; Serhii Onyshchenko
- Revenue: US$100 million (2020)
- Number of employees: 1,100 (2020)
- Website: darnytsia.ua/en

Darnytsia (Ukrainian: Дарниця) is a Ukrainian pharmaceutical company.

== History ==
In 1930, the Kyiv branch of the Ukrainian Institute of Experimental Endocrinology was established, which produced the first drugs in 1932. In particular, hematogen (liquid and tablets). In 1938, new production buildings were put into operation, and by 1940, the production capacity amounted to 4 million units of products, in monetary terms being about 5 million roubles.

During the Second World War, Darnytsia was evacuated to the Urals. In 1950, the Kyiv enterprise was practically restored, and by 1952, the capacity was brought to 15.19 million units of production. In 1954, the branch of the institute was reorganized into the Darnytsia Chemical and Pharmaceutical Plant. At first, it specialized in the production of solutions for injection in ampoules. In the 1960s, a glass-blowing manufacturing facility with a capacity of 300 million ampoules was put into operation.

In 1976, the Kyiv industrial chemical and pharmaceutical association Darnytsia was established. The products of the combined enterprise were exported to 37 countries of the world. In 1985, the Monastyryshchenskyi Chemical and Pharmaceutical Plant was added to this association.

In 1993, Darnytsia was transformed into a collective enterprise. In 1994, the company became a closed joint stock company (CJSC), and since 2012, it has been a private joint stock company (PrJSC).

In the 1990s, Darnytsia began to re-equip production in accordance with the requirements of the GMP (Good Manufacturing Practice) standard. By 2010, according to a study by O. Posylkina and M. Sidorenko, the company was ahead of other Ukrainian enterprises, having certified 5 sites where 112 different drugs were produced.

During the same period, the main production was modernized. In 1997, the reconstruction of the area for aseptic preparation and bottling of medicines was completed. In 2000, the system for obtaining drinking-quality water was reconstructed, in 2002, a new plant of sterile cephalosporin antibiotics was launched, in 2012, the ampoule production was re-equipped.

In the early 2000s, Darnytsia and four other largest enterprises in Ukraine occupied 21% of the Ukrainian market in monetary terms and 32% in physical terms. Those manufacturers provided more than half of all types of medicines produced by the entire Ukrainian pharmaceutical industry (65 factories, 27 pharmaceutical plants, 119 small enterprises and separate workshops).

In 2008, with the help of the German company Schäfer, a logistics complex with a total area of 15 thousand square meters was launched, where there is a robotic high-rise warehouse (32 meters) for 10 thousand pallet places.

According to research by Mykola Grebnev and Inna Vinnikova, by 2009 the company had a production area of more than 30 thousand square meters. The production capacity made it possible to produce over 500 million ampoules, 4 billion tablets, 10 million tubes of soft dosage forms, 30 million vials of sterile antibiotics and 35 million drop vials. According to various estimates, the company's share in the Ukrainian pharmaceutical market was about 7%.

In 2014, the company's net income amounted to ₴1.2 billion. This was the third place among the Ukrainian pharmaceutical manufacturers. In 2015, Darnytsia also ranked third in terms of sales in pharmacies (among 620 Ukrainian and 1,561 foreign participants).

In 2016, Darnytsia was included into the Top 20 most innovative companies in Ukraine by Forbes Ukraine. The company has implemented an ERP system that allows it to control logistics, plan sales and focus a specific production for a specific demand.

In 2019, the company was rebranded.

== Social responsibility and charity ==
According to Natalia Tkachenko, in 2012, Darnytsia was among the top three companies in terms of disclosure of information on corporate social responsibility (among the 20 largest pharmaceutical manufacturers in Ukraine).

Olga Rogulya gives a number of figures for 2019. Among the philanthropic projects, university scholarships were funded for ₴3.4 million, a study of public issues and educational activities of The Aspen Institute Kyiv was funded for ₴1 million, as well as scholarships for participants in the Petro Jacyk International Competition for Experts in the Ukrainian Language.

Assistance to charitable foundations amounted to ₴23.3 million. Social programs and projects were funded, in particular, "З турботою про співвітчизника" ("Taking care of a compatriot"), #GivingTuesday, "Твій безмежний світ" ("Your boundless world").
