= United Energy Systems of Ukraine =

Ukrainian natural gas importer, 1991–2009

United Energy Systems of Ukraine (UESU)
- Industry: Oil and gas
- Founded: Ukrainian Petrol Company (1991)
- Defunct: 2009
- Headquarters: Kyiv and Dnipropetrovsk, Ukraine
- Area served: Ukraine
- Key people: Yulia Tymoshenko (November 1995 - January 1997); Oleksandr Tymoshenko (January 1997 - 2009); Hennady Tymoshenko (died May 2012); Alexander Gravets (vice president and co-owner)
- Products: Natural gas
- Revenue: $4 billion (1996)

United Energy Systems of Ukraine, (UESU) (Ukrainian: Єдині енергетичні системи України, ЄЕСУ), was a natural gas trading company in Ukraine. In the years 1995 and 1996, it was the largest natural gas importer in Ukraine. The company was affected by a series of financial irregularities leading to criminal charges against the principals and closure of the company in 2009.

== Origin ==
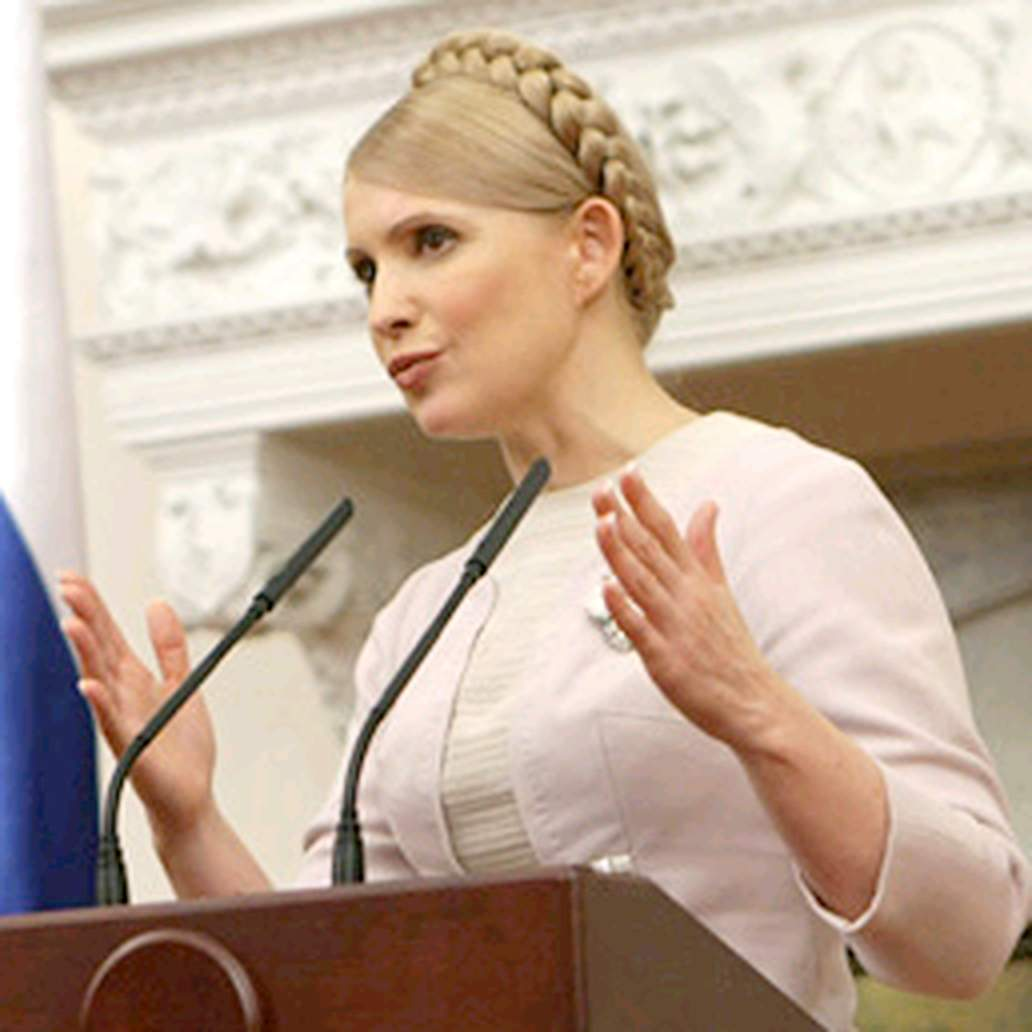
Yulia Tymoshenko

In 1989, Yulia Tymoshenko founded a family cooperative in Dnipropetrovsk. In 1991, Tymoshenko, her husband, Oleksandr, and Olexandr Gravetsas created the Ukrainian Petrol Company, a vendor of gasoline to farmers in Dnipropetrovsk Oblast. In 1995, the company was reorganized into the United Energy Systems of Ukraine.

UESU bought gas from RAO Gazprom (Russia). However, UESU was largely held by a Turkish company, United Energy International Limited (UEIL) and the perhaps inflated payments of Ukraine gas customers was filtered through a number of international locations (allowing a distribution of profits – hundreds of millions of dollars – amongst the energy oligarchs involved), before Russia was paid.

== Growth and decline ==
In 1997, UESU formed a consortium that was responsible for supplies of natural gas to Ukraine from Russia. By 1996 and 1997, UESU was the biggest gas trading company in Ukraine and had branched out into other areas. In early 1997, it controlled several banks, had stakes in metallurgy and machine building companies and in two airports; participated in Bulgarian and Turkish pipelines; and controlled several local and national newspapers. It controlled 80% of Ukraine's natural gas supply and accounted for an estimated eights of Ukraine's GDP.

The decline of UESU related to shifts in power in Ukraine, leaving the principals exposed to criminal charges and the company exposed to heavy taxation.

== Potential conflicts of interest ==
Pavlo Lazarenko, Vice Prime Minister of Ukraine in 1995, was a part owner of UESU. He allocated gasoline quotas to private companies, giving priority to Itera and UESU. Lazarenko resigned in 1997.

In December 1996, Yulia Tymoshenko was elected to the parliament of Ukraine and resigned from the presidency of UESU. Hennady Tymoshenko, her father in law, became UESU president. Tymochenko was Minister of Fuel and Energy (1999 - 2001) and later, prime minister (2005 and 2007 - 2010). In September 1997, UESU was accused of dumping. and at the end of 1997, UESU was excluded from the natural gas market of Ukraine.

== Charges against principals ==
=== Lazarenko ===
In 1999, Lazarenko was arrested in the US and charged with corruption and money laundering. Between 2000 and 2004, Yulia Tymoshenko's ties to Lazarenko were investigated. UESU was dissolved in 2009.

=== Olexandr Tymoshenko and Valery Falkovych ===
In August 2000, Ukrainian police arrested Olexandr Tymoshenko and Valery Falkovych (first deputy general director). Tymoshenko was charged with embezzling US$800,000 in public funds through the export of rolled metal to Asia during the 1990s. On 9 August 2001, following a decision of the Kyiv Sviatoshynsky District Court of the Kyiv region, Tymoshenko and Falkovich were released from custody and all charges against them were dropped. This decision was supported by the Court of Appeal of Kyiv region and the Supreme Court of Ukraine. On 30 April 2002, the Kyiv Svyatoshinsky local court of the Kyiv region dismissed all criminal charges against Oleksandr Tymoshenko and admitted that the actions of the Prosecutor General of Ukraine were illegal.

In early 2012, Oleksandr Tymoshenko received political asylum in the Czech Republic.

=== Yulia Tymoshenko ===
Yulia Tymoshenko was arrested on 13 February 2001 and released on 27 March 2001. She was charged with forgery and gas smuggling. In May 2004, Kyiv's Appeal Court cancelled the lodging of criminal proceedings against her. In December 2005, the Russian Prosecutor General's Office closed all criminal cases against Tymoshenko.

=== Mykola Syvulskyi ===
Syvulskyi, a former deputy minister of finance was arrested and charged in September 1998. It was alleged he had illegally siphoned funds from Ukrgazprom (predecessor of Naftogaz) to UESU.

== Further charges ==
In July 2011, the Ukrainian security service opened a criminal investigation into the embezzlement of $405 million by UESU in 1997.

In April 2012, Tymoshenko faced five charges: organising and attempting to appropriate a large sum of public funds in 1997 and 1998 through receiving value added tax (VAT) (Part 3 of Article 27, Part 5 of Article 191 of the Criminal Code of Ukraine); tax evasion by the UESU Corporation (Part 3 of Article 27, Part 3 of Article 212 of the Criminal Code); the non-payment of income tax (Part 3 of Article 212 of the Criminal Code); and, committing a crime via official forgery (Part 3 of Article 27, Part 2 of Article 366 of the Criminal Code).

Kyivsky District Court of Kharkiv closed the case on 28 February 2014,

"The court has ruled that criminal proceedings on charges against Yulia Volodymyrivna Tymoshenko regarding crimes committed under Part 3, Article 27, Part 5, Article 191, Part 2, Article 15, Part 3, Article 212, and Part 2, Article 366 of the criminal Code have been closed close due to the prosecutor's dropping of the charges." (Kostiantyn Sadovsky, judge.)
