= Sean D. Carr =

Sean D. Carr, Ph.D (born January 21, 1969) is the Executive Director and CEO of the Global Innovation Exchange at the University of Washington in Seattle. He was previously Executive Director of the Batten Institute for Entrepreneurship & Innovation at the University of Virginia. He is also co-author, along with Robert F. Bruner, of the book The Panic of 1907: Lessons Learned from the Market's Perfect Storm. The book focuses on the early 20th Century financial disaster known as the Panic of 1907.

== Career ==
Carr holds an MBA and PhD from the Darden School of Business at the University of Virginia. He also has an MS in Journalism from Columbia University, and an undergraduate degree in Classics from Northwestern University. Previously he was a producer at CNN in Washington, D.C. He was also a producer at ABC News' Good Morning America, and World News Tonight with Peter Jennings. Carr is married and resides in Charlottesville, Va.

== See also ==
Listen to Sean Carr's interview with NPR's Robert Siegel, August 28, 2007

- Robert F. Bruner's Blog
- Financial Times analysis comparing 1907 crash to 2007 Stock Market
- Wall Street Journal Online's review of The Panic of 1907
- Reuters' Review as appeared in Boston Globe, August 12, 2007
