= Glib Zagoriy =

Ukrainian businessman, politician (born 1976)

- Загорій Гліб Володимирович

Co-owner of the PrJSC Pharmaceutical company "Darnitsa".

Personal details
- Born: August 21, 1976 (age 49)

Glib Zagoriy (Ukrainian: Загорій Гліб Володимирович), (born August 21, 1976) is a Ukrainian businessman, scholar. He is a co-owner of the PrJSC Pharmaceutical company "Darnitsa". He was a member of the Ukrainian Parliament (the Verkhovna Rada of Ukraine) of the 8th convocation (2014—2019).

== Biography ==
=== Education ===
Glib Zagoriy graduated Kyiv National Economic University (1998) and National University of Pharmacy (2000).

=== Career ===
Since 1997, he has worked in various positions at the Darnitsa pharmaceutical company. During 2009-2014, Glib Zagoriy was the general director of the company. At the same time, he taught at higher educational institutions: since 2016 — at the Department of Industrial Pharmacy of the Kyiv National University of Technologies and Design, and since 2012 — at the Department of Organization and Economics of Pharmacy of the Shupyk NMAPE.

During 2014-2019, he was a People's Deputy of Ukraine.

In 2019 Glib Zagoriy returned to the management of the Darnitsa company as its co-owner.

== Political activity ==
In 2014, Glib Zagoriy was elected a member of the Ukrainian Parliament on the party lists of the Petro Poroshenko Bloc (#52). He became a member of the Verkhovna Rada of Ukraine Committee on Veterans and Persons with Disabilities.

According to the report of the OPORA Civic Network, in June 2018 Glib Zagoriy was the most productive among other deputies: 42% of his bills were supported in the first 3.5 years of work in parliament.

In May 2019 Glib Zagoriy stated that he was not going to run for parliament because, in his opinion, he completed his legislative mission.

== Arts patronage and charities ==
Glib Zagoriy is involved in charity with his family, using the family foundation Zagoriy Foundation (founded in 2015). He has personally participated in a number of charitable projects. Since 2004, Zagoriy has been financially and directly involved in helping the Beniuk-Hostikoiev theatre company. In 2008, the play About Mice and People, where Glib Zagoriy acted as the author of the idea and producer, was awarded the Shevchenko National Prize.

He helps to develop the Ukrainian Catholic University's (UCU) material and technical base. In particular, in December 2019, at a charity evening, Zagoriy allocated ₴12.5 million. During 2014 — 2019, Glib Zagoriy was donating his People's Deputy of Ukraine salary to the educational process fund of the UCU. Zagoriy also supports the educational process of the National University of Pharmacy, whose students undergo industrial and pre-diploma practices in the Darnitsa company.

Glib Zagoriy was a member of the Council for the Development of the Mystetskyi Arsenal National Art and Culture Museum Complex (2016—2020).

== Sport ==
Glib Zagoriy was a member of the Board of the Ju-Jitsu Association of Ukraine as an honorary president of this organization.

Zagoriy also took part in the rally as a navigator (co-driver). In 2005 Glib Zagoriy became the Champion of Ukraine as part of the Ace Racing team (first pilot — Volodymyr Petrenko). In 2006–2007 Glib played in the teams of Volodymyr Petrenko and the Polish first pilot Tomasz Chopik.
