= Eugenia Tymoshenko =

Ukrainian entrepreneur and activist

- Євгенія Тимошенко
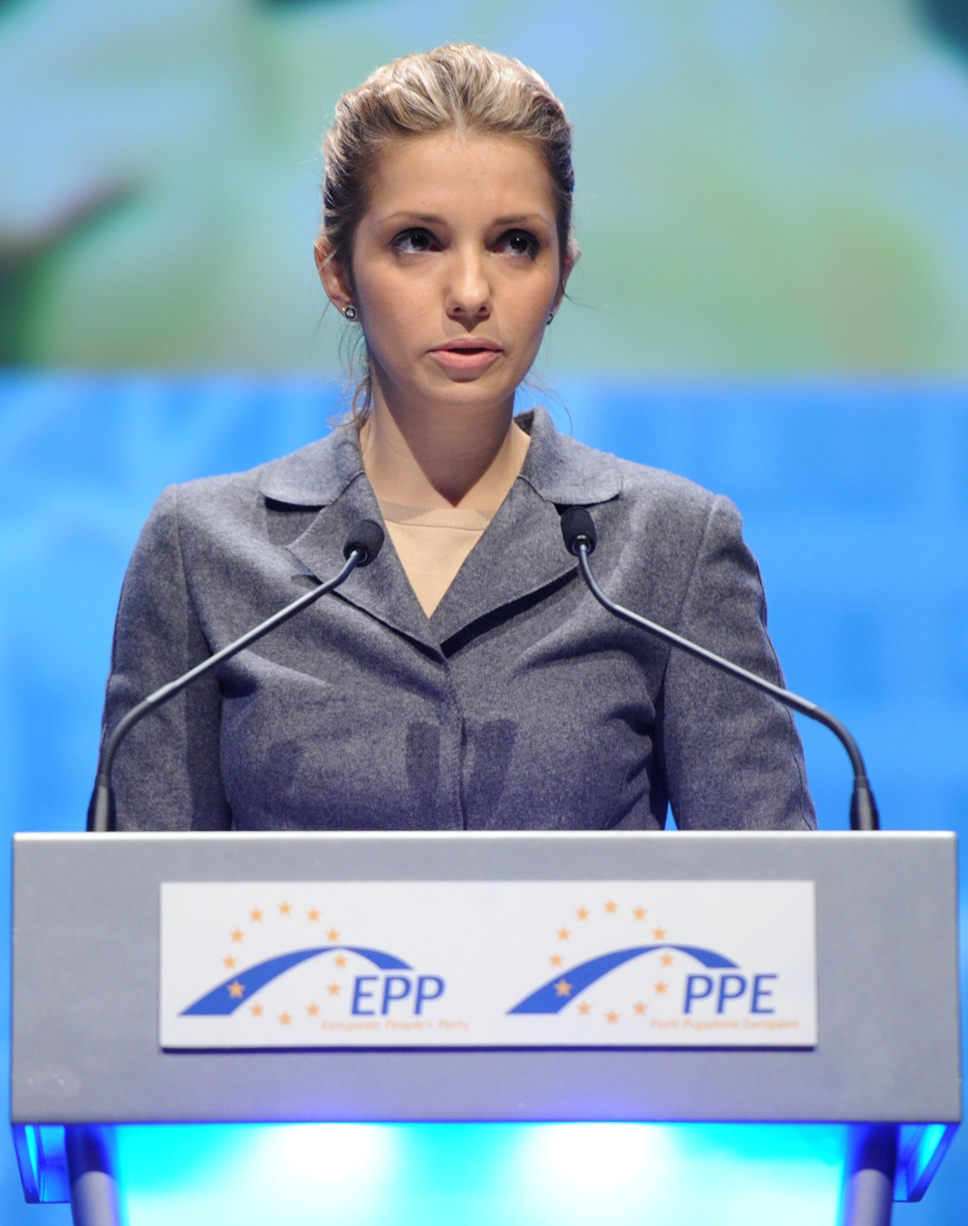
- Tymoshenko in 2014
- Born: Eugenia Oleksandrivna Tymoshenko; 20 February 1980 (age 46); Dnipropetrovsk, Ukrainian SSR, Soviet Union (now Dnipro, Ukraine)
- Education: London School of Economics
- Occupations: Entrepreneur, philanthropist, activist
- Spouses: Sean Carr (m. 2005; div. 2013) Arthur Chechetkin (m. 2014)
- Children: 3
- Parent(s): Yulia Tymoshenko; Oleksandr Tymoshenko
- Awards: Crans Montana Forum's Gold Medal

Eugenia Oleksandrivna Tymoshenko (Ukrainian: Євге́нія Олекса́ндрівна Тимоше́нко, romanized: Yevheniya Oleksandrivna Tymoshenko; born 20 February 1980) is a Ukrainian entrepreneur, philanthropist and activist who is founder and president of Child.ua, a non-profit organization. She is the daughter of former Ukrainian Prime Minister Yulia Tymoshenko.

== Biography ==
Tymoshenko was born on 20 February 1980 to Oleksandr Tymoshenko and Yulia Tymoshenko in Dnipropetrovsk, Ukraine. In 1994, she entered Rugby School in the UK, a former all-boys school which had become co-educational in 1992. She graduated in 1998. Eugenia then went on to London School of Economics and Political Science (LSE), earning her Bachelor's in Government and Economics in 2001 and Master's in Russian and Post-Soviet studies in 2002.

According to herself, she owns a restaurant and "also businesses in Dnipropetrovsk". She has repeatedly stated she is not going to become a politician.

== Philanthropy ==
Tymoshenko is founder and president of the children's charity association "CHILD.UA" and co-founder of the charity children's art festival Follow Your Dream (Ukrainian: Назустріч Мрії), working with orphans and underprivileged children and promoting human rights and development of children's talents and creativity. Eugenia Tymoshenko takes care of children with special needs. She founded the Autism Friendly Space program, which aims to raise awareness about autism and develop a culture of tolerance for people with autism spectrum disorders. In April 2019, with the participation of Tymoshenko, more than 100 children with autism spectrum disorders (ASD) visited a cinema and watched a cartoon in a format convenient for them.

During the escalation of the war with Russia in the Donbas, on the International Day of Peace, Tymoshenko founded and organized The Voice of Peace (Ukrainian: Голос Миру), a charitable marathon in Ukraine that unites media, business, artists and public figures to volunteer to help wounded soldiers and refugees.

== Release of Yulia Tymoshenko ==
Eugenia Tymoshenko was her mother's defender during the trial against her in the summer-autumn 2011. For two and a half years of the former prime minister's imprisonment Eugenia conducted an active campaign for her release: held dozens of meetings with leaders of the European Union, the Western countries and international organizations, delivered speeches in the US Senate, at the meeting of the Committee on Foreign affairs of the Italian Parliament, at the Bornholm conference in Denmark, at the 20th Congress of the European People's Party, at the congresses of the German Christian Social Union and the Italian party "The Union of Christian and Centre Democrats", in the media.

Yulia Tymoshenko was awarded the Manuel Carrasco I Formiguera medal by representatives of the Spanish political party "Unió Democràtica de Catalunya" for her contribution to the defense of democracy and freedom and the struggle for the restoration of the rule of law in Ukraine. The award was received by Eugenia Tymoshenko on behalf of her mother in Barcelona, Spain, on 11 July 2013.

In February 2012, Eugenia Tymoshenko submitted a statement to the Prosecutor General of Ukraine to demand investigation in prison of the facts about the torture of her mother.

On 24 November 2013, Eugenia Tymoshenko made a speech on the stage on Maidan Nezalezhnosti during Euromaidan, in particular read her mother's letter addressed to the Ukrainians. On 21 February 2014 during the meeting with Vice-President of the European Parliament Gianni Pittella and Speaker of the Italian Parliament Laura Boldrini Eugenia Tymoshenko urged the European Union to immediately impose sanctions against representatives of Yanukovych's regime responsible for the bloodshed in Ukraine.

On 4 October 2014, Eugenia Tymoshenko in Milan, Italy presented the book "Ukraine, Gas and Handcuffs: The Trial of Yulia Tymoshenko", it. "Ucraina, gas e manette: il processo a Yulia Tymoshenko". Author of books on political persecution of Yulia Tymoshenko at the time of the Yanukovych regime is an Italian analyst Mateo Cazzulani. The title "Ukraine, Gas and Handcuffs: The Trial of Yulia Tymoshenko" demonstrates a clear understanding that energy is the key source of Ukraine's dependence. The author draws a clear parallel between Ukraine and the fate of Yulia Tymoshenko, who was also denied her freedom because of her fight against corruption, the oligarchy and the dependence of the Ukrainian energy sector on Russian energy.

== Awards ==
On 20 October 2012, Tymoshenko received the Crans Montana Forum Medal for her contribution for defending democracy and human rights. The Crans Montana Forum was founded in 1986, works closely with the United Nations, UNESCO, the European Union and other institutions to ensure the stability, security and respect for human rights in the world.

== Personal life ==
Tymoshenko was married to English rock musician Sean Carr (1968 – 2018), who was the leader of the British-Ukrainian band "Death Valley Screamers" and owner of several stores in the UK. The couple married on 1 October 2005. In December 2011, she changed her surname back from Carr to Tymoshenko. In September 2012, Tymoshenko announced that she was divorced and in February 2013, the couple's divorce was legally finalized.

Since 27 December 2014, Tymoshenko has been married to Ukrainian businessman Arthur Chechetkin. The couple is raising three children.
