= Zagoriy Foundation =

Ukrainian charitable foundation

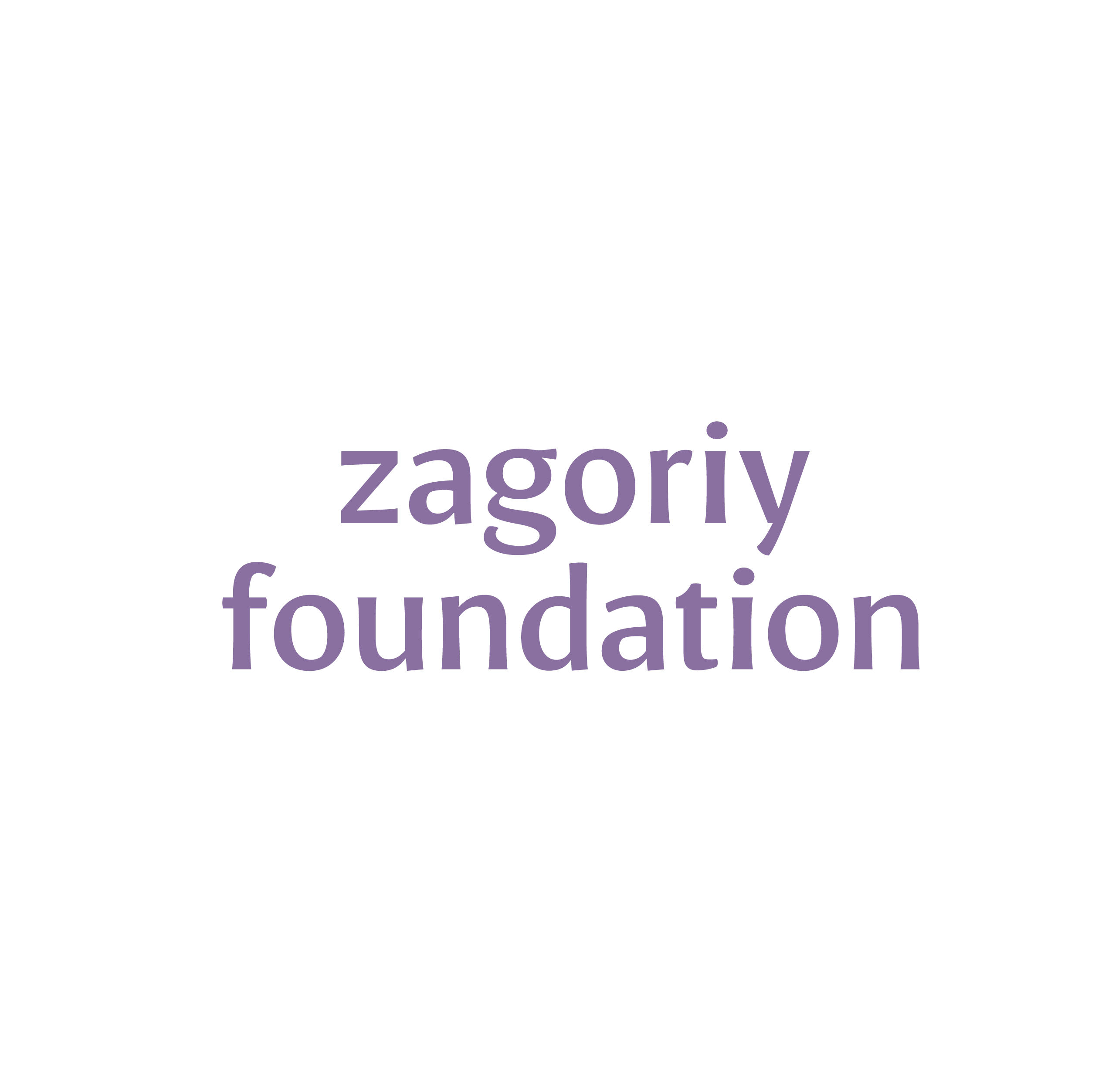
- Abbreviation: ZF
- Formation: 2015; 11 years ago
- Founders: Family Zagoriy
- Type: Foundation (nonprofit)
- Purpose: Development of charity culture in Ukraine
- Headquarters: Kyiv, Ukraine
- Region served: Ukraine
- Website: zagoriy.foundation
- Formerly called: Zagoriy Family Foundation

Zagoriy Foundation is a Ukrainian charitable foundation that develops the culture of charitable giving in Ukraine and provides support to non-profit organizations. Other areas of the Foundation's operation are educational and research projects aimed at improving the efficiency of the charity sector.

== History ==
The Foundation was established in 2015 by Kateryna, Glib and Volodymyr Zagoriy and was called the Zagoriy Family Foundation. The purpose of the Foundation was to develop the culture of charity in Ukraine, and increase trust in charitable institutions.

In 2019, the foundation was transformed into Zagoriy Foundation.

In 2022, after the Russian invasion of Ukraine, support and development of the non-commercial sector in Ukraine became one of the main areas of the Foundation's work.

== Activity ==
During its work, the Foundation has implemented and supported a number of educational and artistic projects, conducted research, awareness raising campaigns and grant competitions. It cooperates with Ukrainian Catholic University, Ukrainian Cultural Foundation and Kyiv School of Economics. According to open reports, over the years of its operation, the Foundation has invested more than UAH 80 million in charity and cultural development.

=== International cooperation ===
The Foundation cooperates with Candid, an American organization that disseminates information about benefactors and beneficiaries from around the world. Namely, Zagoriy Foundation grants are displayed on Foundation Maps. Thanks to cooperation with international media focusing on philanthropy, in particular, Alliance Magazine and Philanthropy News Digest, the Foundation regularly creates and publishes up-to-date analytical materials.

The Foundation is a member of the following international associations:

- Philanthropy Europe Association (Philea);
- WINGS(з);
- National Center for Family Philanthropy (NCFP);
- European Venture Philanthropy Association (EVPA).

=== Research ===
The Foundation commissions sociological research of the non-profit sector in Ukraine. The major study of the Foundation is Charity through the Eyes of Ukrainians – it was conducted twice: in 2019 and 2021.

Also, at the Foundation's initiative, research was conducted on «Charity in the Context of Coronavirus», «Trust in Charitable Organizations» and «Needs and Work of NGOs during the War».

Thanks to the partnership with CAF and the IU Lilly Family School of Philanthropy, the Foundation has the rights to translate international research in the field of philanthropy into Ukrainian, which it publishes on its website.

=== Grant-making activity ===
Since 2020, the Foundation has been conducting open grant competitions and accepting out-of-competition proposals. In its grant support, the Foundation focuses on the projects aimed at developing the culture of charitable giving in Ukraine. Throughout 2020–2022, a total of 75 projects were supported total worth of about UAH 12 million (as of July 2022).

As part of the grant support of the Foundation, programs such as Leaders of Ukrainian Charity, educational programs aimed at creating certain conditions for children and adults with autism, as well as a program to support non-governmental organizations during the war were implemented.

=== Educational projects ===
==== Charity Match ====
In 2021, Zagoriy Foundation launched a training program for professionals of non-profit organizations. The goal of the program is to teach organizations to create more effective fundraising campaigns, to learn more about organizing the work processes, building partnerships, communication and reporting.

==== School of rehabilitation medicine ====
Throughout 2016–2019, the Foundation supported free trainings, open lectures and educational conferences on rehabilitation medicine and modern methods of rehabilitation care that were conducted on the basis of the Ukrainian Catholic University. A total of over 1,000 participants received training.

==== Entrepreneurial activity for the veterans of ATO and JFO ====
Throughout 2018–2020, in cooperation with Kyiv School of Economics, a training program on the basics of entrepreneurship was created for the veterans of ATO and JFO. In total, four waves of training were provided for more than 100 participants who implemented more than 50 projects.

==== MeeTheFuture ====
In 2018, a lecture series was launched to introduce Ukrainians to the new and current global trend setters. So far, the following figures have come to Ukraine with lectures: Naim Zafar, Professor of the Business School of the University of California, Berkeley; political activist and member of the Army of Lovers band Alexander Bard; British composer and artist “considered the world’s first cyborg", Neil Harbisson; American writer and author of the book New Power Jeremy Heimans.

=== Other projects ===
==== Giving Tuesday Ukraine ====
Giving Tuesday is an international movement of good deeds designed to unite people around charity. In 2018, Kateryna Zagoriy became one of the initiators of the project of the global movement #GivingTuesday in Ukraine, which first started on November 27, 2018. Giving Tuesday promotes the idea that good deeds can be done in different ways – by sharing somebody's time, talent, money or information.

==== Media of Great Stories ====
In 2021, the Foundation launched the first charity media in Ukraine – Media of Great Stories. The resource talks about trends and news in charity, the work of the third sector, and also publishes interviews with experts and updates on ongoing projects.

==== Global Teacher Prize ====
Since 2019, the Foundation has been supporting the Global Teacher Prize in Ukraine.

==== Information campaigns ====
The Foundation runs information campaigns, aiming at telling more about charity, destroy myths around it, and promote the culture of charitable giving. Examples include the campaign «Who Is Behind This?» – a series of monuments to prominent patrons of Kyiv (Halshka Hulevychivna, Nikolai von Bunge and others), as well as the installation «Break the Ice of Prejudice».

In addition, many art projects were sponsored, such as Pavlo Gudimov's exhibition «Angels» or the animated series «History of Those Who Care» which tells about the lives of prominent Ukrainian patrons.

=== Activities during the Russian invasion to Ukraine ===
After the full-scale invasion of the Russian army on the territory of Ukraine, Zagoriy Foundation adapted its activities to address ongoing problems. Currently, the Foundation is developing four major areas of work:

- Development and coordination of the charity sector in Ukraine;
- Support of grantees and partners for more effective work;
- Creation and distribution of useful materials about philanthropy in Ukraine;
- International cooperation.

During the war, the Foundation conducted a grant competition to support non-profit organization and a study on the needs of such organization. In addition, a second Charity Match training course was held, supplemented with wartime work-oriented materials.

== Recognition ==
Zagoriy Foundation won the National Competition «Charity Ukraine-2021» in the Charity Action of the Year nomination with the Giving Race project implemented jointly with Kind Challenge.

In April 2022, Zagoriy Foundation received validation from CAF America.

== Documents ==
Research
