= Family of Yulia Tymoshenko =

Family of Ukrainian politician

- Origin: Russian Empire, Soviet Union, Ukrainian, Latvian

The family of Yulia Volodymyrivna Tymoshenko (Юлія Володимирівна Тимошенко), née Hrihyan (Грігян), former Prime Minister of Ukraine, is Ukrainian on her mother's side, and Latvian and Jewish on her father's side. Her ancestry was of some relevance during her campaign of 2009–2010, Tymoshenko herself has self-identified as "Ukraino-Latvian" (україно-латишка), "both for ten generations". while her opponents drawing attention to her Jewish grandfather was described as a political "smear". A detailed account of her family history was published in 2008 by Dmytro Chobit.

Tymoshenko's parents were both born in Ukraine and are, therefore, Ukrainian as defined by the Law on Citizenship of Ukraine and by the Ukrainian Constitution.

== Immediate family ==
=== Oleksandr Tymoshenko ===
Yulia Tymoshenko is married to Oleksandr Tymoshenko (born 11 June 1960). A businessman, he married Yulia Telehina in 1979, and she took his name.

During the early years of her political career, the two were parted for years while Oleksandr Tymoshenko was evading arrest.

They have a daughter, Eugenia (Yevhenia) (born in 1980). According to an income declaration filled in by Yulia Tymoshenko, her husband's income is higher than hers. Tymoshenko's hypocorism for her husband is "Sasha". Tymoshenko has expressed regret that she neglected her family due to her political activity.

Oleksandr Tymoshenko and his father Hennady Tymoshenko were members of the board of United Energy Systems of Ukraine. In August 2000 Oleksandr Tymoshenko was arrested and charged with bribing former Prime Minister Pavlo Lazarenko as a member of the board of United Energy Systems of Ukraine; the charges were dropped in May 2002. Tymoshenko's father-in-law has also been arrested in connection with this case; he was released in 2003. According to Tymoshenko her spouse has never been personally involved in the Bloc Yulia Tymoshenko.

In early January 2012, Oleksandr Tymoshenko was granted asylum in the Czech Republic, as he had requested at the end of the previous year.

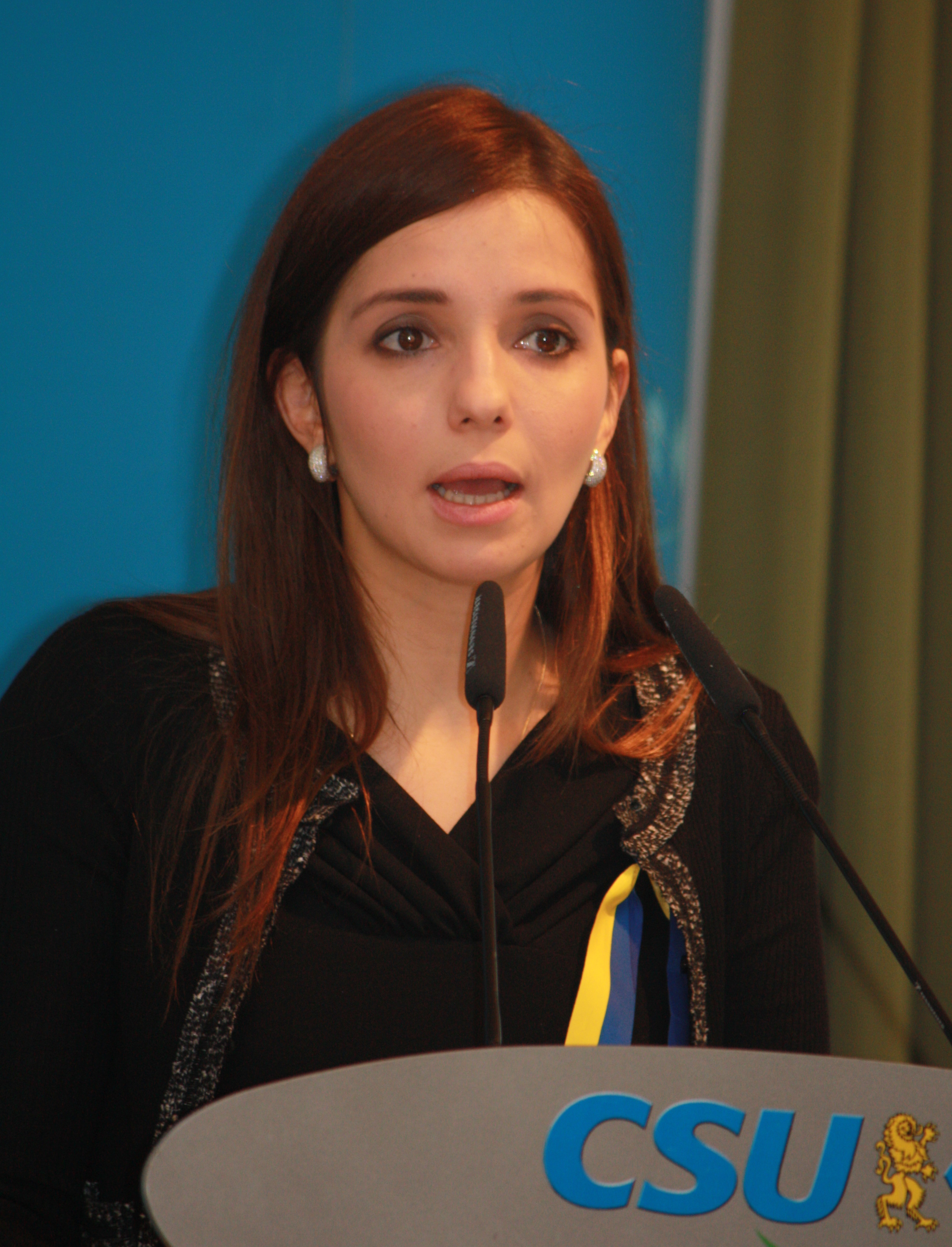
Eugenia Tymoshenko at a congress of the Christian Social Union in Bavaria in Schrobenhausen, January 2014.

=== Eugenia Tymoshenko ===
Eugenia Tymoshenko is the daughter of Yulia Tymoshenko and Olexandr Tymoshenko. She was born on 20 February 1980, and moved to London when she was 14, boarding at Rugby School. She is a graduate of the London School of Economics in the field of politics and philosophy. Eugenia spent nine years in England.

Eugenia Tymoshenko was her mother’s defender during the trial against her in the summer-autumn 2011. For two and a half years of the former prime minister imprisonment Eugenia conducted an active campaign for her release: held dozens of meetings with leaders of the European Union, the Western countries and international organizations, delivered speeches in the US Senate, at the meeting of the Committee on Foreign affairs of the Italian Parliament, at the Bornholm conference in Denmark, at the 20th Congress of the European People's Party, at congresses of the German Christian Social Union and the Italian party "The Union of Christian and Centre Democrats", in the media.

In February 2012, Eugenia Tymoshenko submitted a statement to the Prosecutor General of Ukraine to demand investigation in prison of the facts about the torture of her mother.

== Awards ==
Eugenia Tymoshenko received the Crans Montana Forum Medal for her contribution to defending democracy and human rights. The Crans Montana Forum was founded in 1986, works closely with the United Nations, UNESCO, the European Union and other institutions to ensure the stability, security and respect for human rights in the world.

== Family history ==
=== Liudmila Telehina ===
Yulia Tymoshenko was raised by her mother Liudmila Mykolaivna Telehina (Людмила Миколаївна Телегіна), née Nelepova (Нелепова), who was born 11 September 1937, in Dnipropetrovsk. Liudmila married at an early age and took the married name Telehina. It is unknown how long this first marriage lasted or why it was dissolved, but Liudmila was married a second time, to Volodymyr Abramovych Hrihian, at some point before 1960. When this second marriage was also dissolved, in 1963, Lyudmila returned to her first married name, as Lyudmila Telegina, while her daughter Yulia kept her father's surname, as Yulia Volodymyrivna Hrihyan, but she did use her mother's married name "Telehina" when graduating in 1979.

Lyudmila's sister, Antonina Ulyahina, in 2008 published the book «Юля, Юлечка», about her memoirs surrounding the then Prime Minister. In the book, she does mention her parents (Tymoshenko's maternal grandparents) but she never names them, and their identities remain unknown. Chobit (2008) suggests that the reason is that Tymoshenko wanted to suggest her grandparents had an ethnic Ukrainian identity, while both her mother and her aunt, Lyudmila Mykolayivna and Antonina Mykolayivna, are Russian-speaking Ukrainians, noting that Tymoshenko herself only learned to speak Ukrainian in 1999.

=== Volodymyr Hrihian ===
Yulia Tymoshenko's father Volodymyr Abramovych Hrihian—who abandoned Liudmila Telehina and his daughter when Yulia was three years old—was born December 3, 1937, in Dnipropetrovsk. His father was Abram Kelmanovych Kapitelman (Ukrainian: Абрам Кельманович Капітельман, born in 1914); His mother was Maria Yosypivna Hrihian, born in 1909, of Latvian nationality. Volodymyr Abramovych was registered under his mother's surname of Hrihian as was commonly done at the time to avoid Jewish-sounding surnames. Abram Kapitelman graduated from Dnipropetrovsk State University in 1940, and was sent to work in Western Ukraine, where he worked "one academic quarter" as the director of a public Jewish school in the city Sniatyn. In the autumn of 1940 Kapitelman was mobilized into the army, he was killed while taking part in World War II on November 8, 1944, with the rank of "lieutenant communications".

Volodymyr Abramovych Hrihian's maternal grandfather, Yosyp Yosypovych Hrihian (Ukrainian: Йосип Йосипович Грігян, also spelled "Hrihan", Гріган), was born in Riga, then in the Russian Empire, in 1884. In 1914, he moved to Yekaterinoslav (now Dnipropetrovsk), where he worked as a conductor on the train (the station "Lotsmanka" in Dnipropetrovsk). He was arrested in 1937 and again in 1938 (because of having received letters from Latvia) during the political repression in the Soviet Union. The prosecution of the criminal case stated: "Hrihan discredited the Soviet regime among the workers, praised the good life of the working class in the fascist countries: Germany and Poland"). Hrihian served 10 years in Soviet Gulags (1938–1948) and was rehabilitated in 1963. It is known from Yosyp Hrihian's case file that at the time of his first arrest in 1937, he was married to one Olena Titivna Hrihian, of Ukrainian nationality, born in 1893 in Martynivka, Kishenkiv District, Poltava Province. It does not seem plausible that this Olena Titivna (b. 1893) was the mother of Maria Yosypivna Hrihian, Yulia Tymoshenko's paternal grandmother (b. 1909), because Volodymyr Abramovych Hrihian stated he came to Yekaterinoslav only in 1914. Chobit (2008) instead assumes that Maria Yosypivna was the daughter of an unrecorded first wife of Volodymyr Hrihian's.
