= Chervona kalyna (event) =

Annual art festival in Shmankivtsi, Ukraine

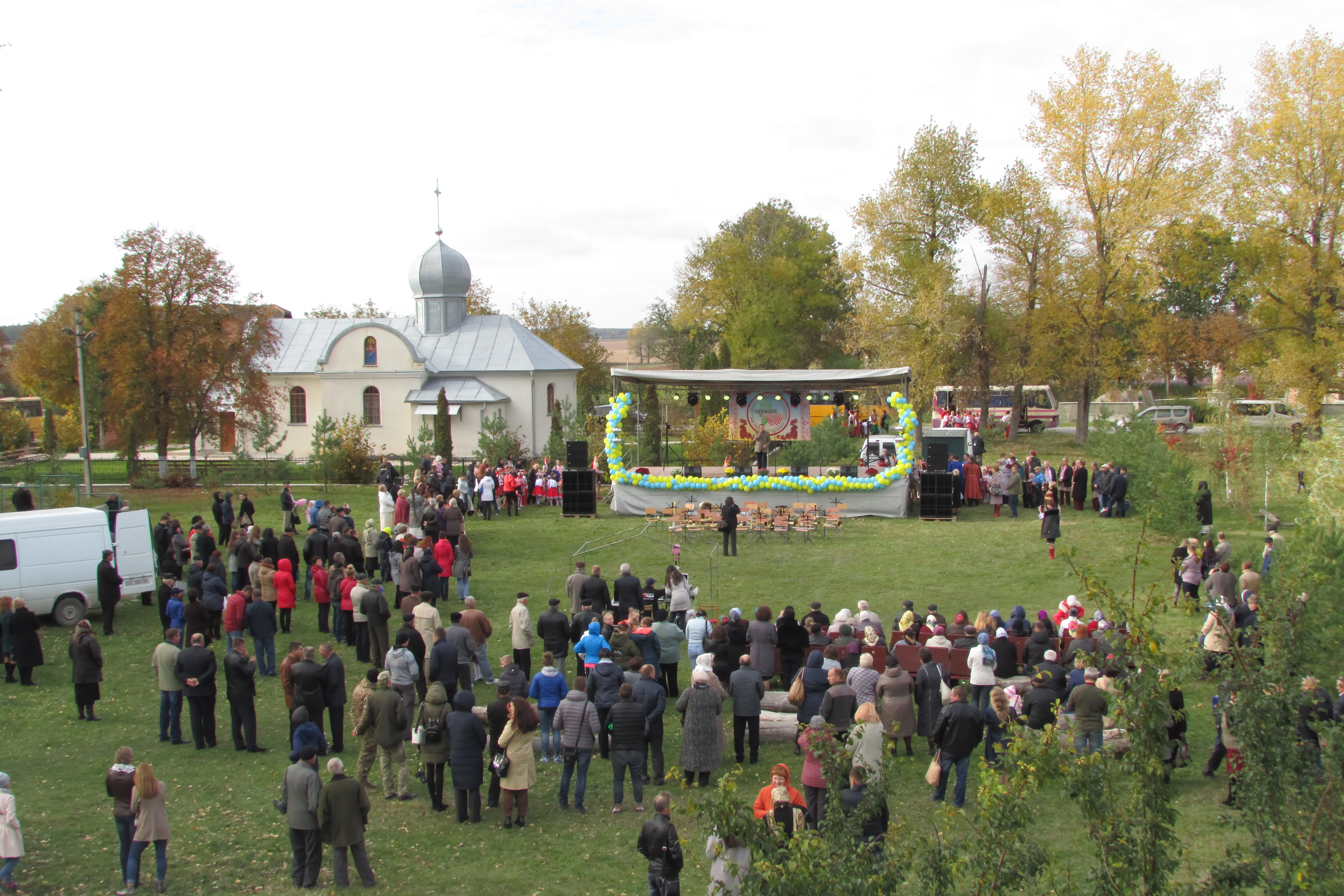
2017

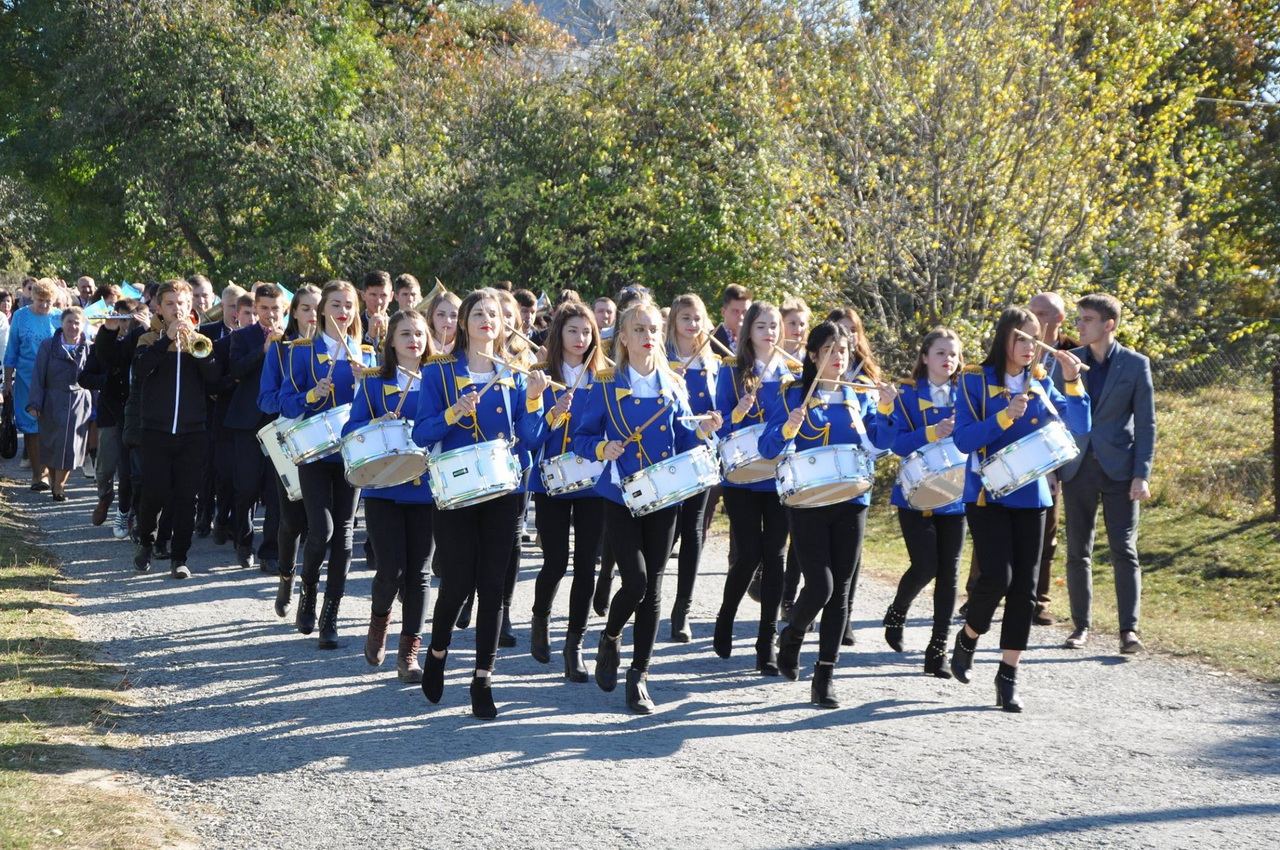
2019

Chervona kalyna (Ukrainian: Червона калина) is a regional art festival dedicated to the anniversary of Stepan Charnetskyi's birth. It is held annually in October in the village of Shmankivtsi, Chortkiv Raion, Ternopil Oblast, Ukraine. It was first held on 26 May 1991, with the unveiling of a statue of Stepan Charnetskyi.

== History of festivals ==
=== 1991 ===
A month before the first festivities, 110 red viburnum bushes were planted on the site of the former plebaneum to commemorate the 110th anniversary of the poet's birth.

The festival was held on 26 May 1991, with the unveiling of a statue of Stepan Charnetskyi (initiated by Nadiia Protskiv). It was the 110th anniversary of the poet's birth. The event was organized by Halyna Sushelnytska, a fellow countryman and head of the Department of Culture. The poet's daughter, Oleksandra Charnetska-Kuchma, was also present.

During the festival, blue and yellow flags were flown for the first time at the stadium with red flags.

=== 2010s ===
In 2013, the festivities were attended by the creator of the statue of Stepan Charnetskyi, sculptor Ivan Muliarchuk.

In 2015, the first stage of the festival took place on 4 October in the village of Shmankivtsi, and the second on 14 October, in Chortkiv Castle.

In 2016, the festival was the setting for the Ukrainian record of "Largest performance of the rifle anthem of Ukraine".

In 2018, the poet's great-granddaughter, Olesia Chaikovska, and her family attended the festival.

Various participants of amateur artistic activities from the settlements of the region's communities, the city, the district cultural center, pedagogical and medical colleges, Terebovlya Vocational College of Culture and Arts, invited guests from Ternopil and others will perform. The festival also includes an exhibition-fair of regional artisans, where you can buy their products.
