= Saint Nicholas chapel, Shmankivtsi =

Ukrainian Orthodox chapel in Shmankivtsi, Ukraine

Saint Nicholas Chapel Каплиця святого Миколая
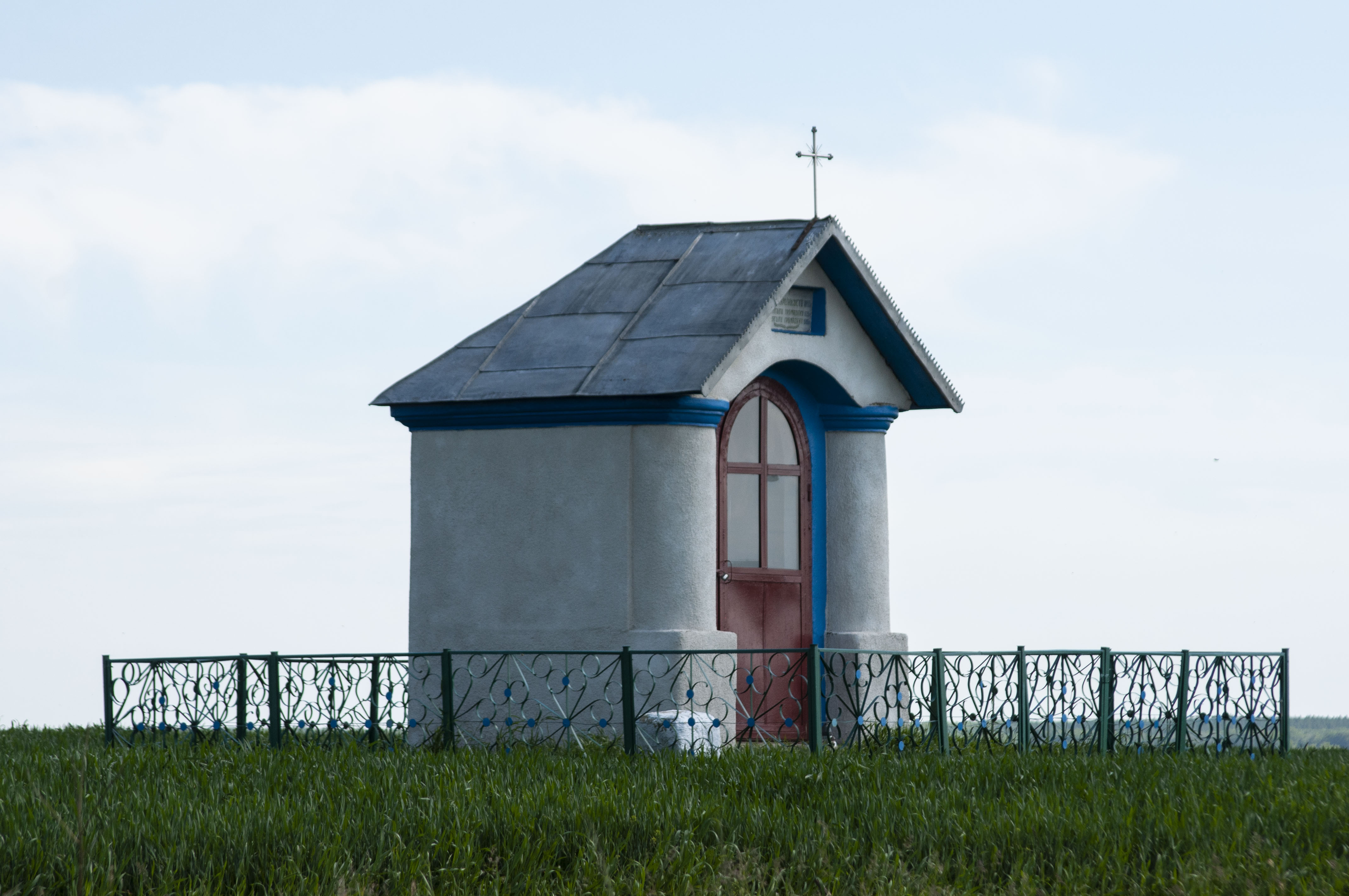

- Location within Ternopil Oblast

Religion
- Affiliation: Orthodox Church of Ukraine

Location
- Location: Shmankivtsi
- Interactive map of Saint Nicholas Chapel; Каплиця святого Миколая
- Coordinates: 48°59′33″N 25°55′46″E

Architecture
- Architect: Mykola Karpinskyi
- Completed: 1869; 157 years ago 1989; 37 years ago (rebuilt)

Saint Nicholas Chapel (Ukrainian: Каплиця святого Миколая) orthodox (PCU) chapel, a newly-discovered architectural monument in the village of Shmankivtsi, Zavodske settlement hromada, Chortkiv Raion, Ternopil Oblast of Ukraine. It is located on the eastern outskirts of the village.

== History ==
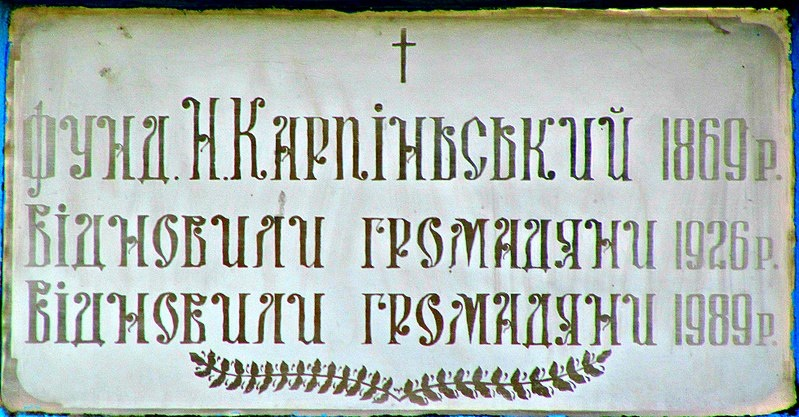
The table, which is installed on the facade of the chapel

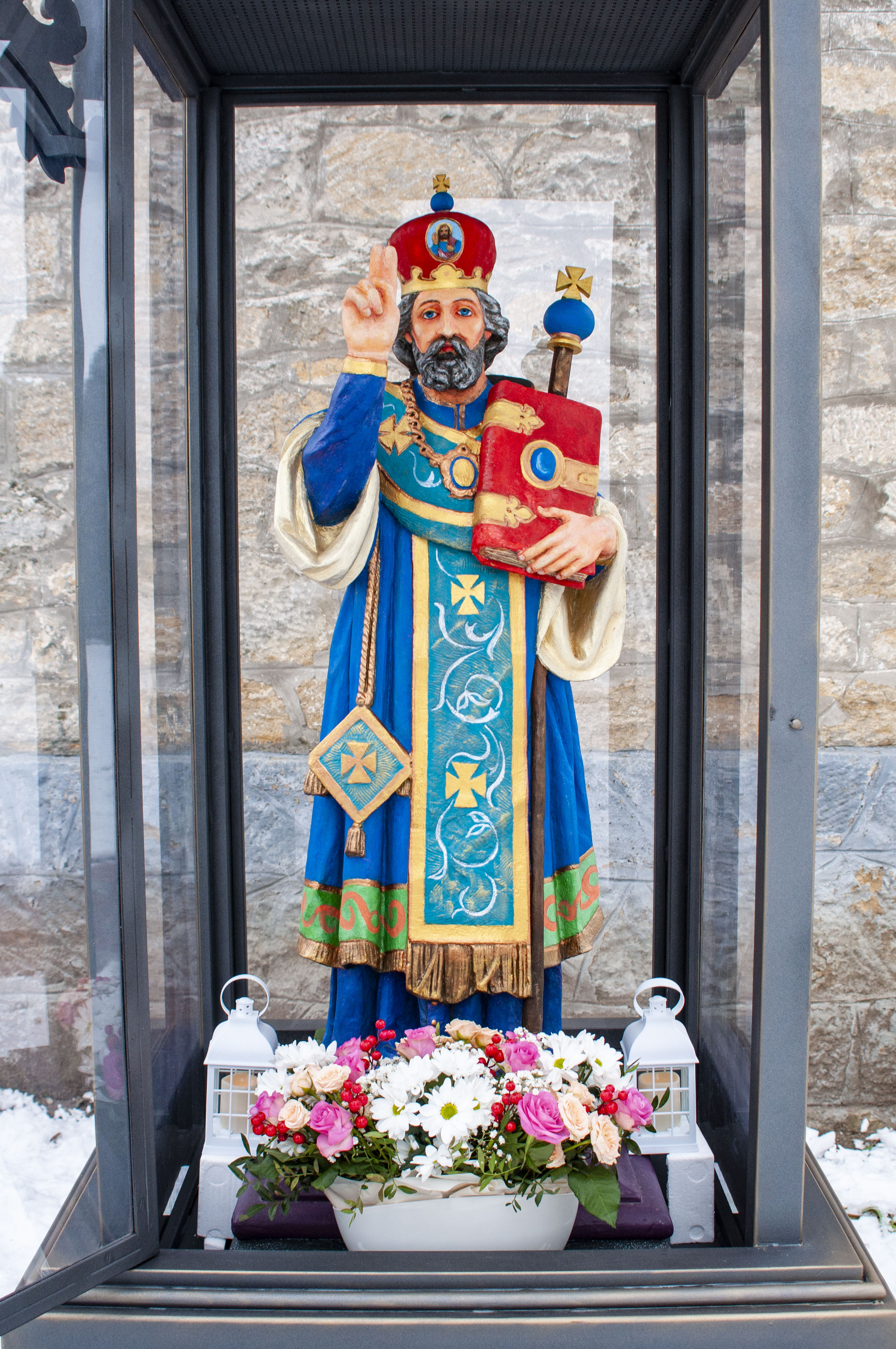
Statue of St. Nicholas near the Orthodox Church

In 1869, a chapel of St. Nicholas was built in the eastern suburbs, in honor of the abolition of serfdom. Mykola Karpinsky was the founder of the construction.

In 1926, after returning from working in Canada, villagers Martyn and Anna Vavrynevych restored the chapel and donated a figure of St. Nicholas.

But in the Soviet era, the shrine was destroyed. Yosyp Syvak and Mykhailo Vavrynevych built a cover for the figure with their own hands and moved it to the courtyard of the Church of Saints Cosmas and Damian.

The abandoned chapel was later damaged again.

In 1989, the idea of restoring the shrine was proposed by women who worked in the fields. Repairs were started, floors were covered and plastered. Volodymyr Ziatyk (roofing), Petro Zakharchuk (doors), Orest Vavrynevych (framing and throne for the image of St. Nicholas) and many people who donated to the fundraiser contributed to the work. Two of the most active villagers, Anna Matskiv and Melaniia Vavrynevych, planned to buy an icon of St. Nicholas. They went to the town of Sokal in the Lviv Oblast to meet Zinovii Tymoshyk, one of the church's painters. He painted an icon and donated it.

On May 26, 2019, a festive prayer was held on the occasion of the 150th anniversary of the Chapel of St. Nicholas.

== Modernity ==
The chapel is cared for by the Halyna Ushii. Every year on December 18–19, villagers come to light a candle for a good year and the harvest. The chapel is believed by some to protect the village from natural disasters and calamities.

== Sources ==
- Шманьківці. Храм св. вмч. і безсрр Косми і Даміана // Храми Української Православної Церкви Київського патріархату. Тернопільщина / Автор концепції Куневич Б.; головний редактор Буяк Я.; фото: Снітовський О., Крочак І., Кислинський Е., Бурдяк В. — Тернопіль : ТОВ «Новий колір», 2012. — С. 383. : іл. — ISBN 978-966-2061-24-6.
- (in English) Smankivci // Історичний шематизм Львівської архієпархії (1832—1944) : у 2 т. / Дмитро Блажейовський. — Київ : КМ Академія, 2004. — Т. 1 : Адміністрація і парохії. — P. 744–745. — ISBN 966-518-225-0.
- (in English) Smankivci // Dmytro Blazheyovskyi. Historical sematism of the Eparchy of Stanyslaviv: From its establishment until the outbreak of World War II (1885–1938). — Записки ЧСВВ, Секція I. — Т. 51. Lviv: Misioner, 2002. — P. 212. — ISBN 966-658-028-4.
- Огородник, М. Відроджена капличка // Вільне життя плюс. — 2015. — No. 88 (30 жовтня). — С. 5. — (Спогад).
- Огородник, М. Під прихистком святого Миколая // Голос народу. — 2016. — No. 24 (17 червня). — С. 5. — (Духовні обереги).
- Огородник, М. Під прихистком святого Миколая // Вільне життя плюс. — 2016. — No. 51 (1 липня). — С. 5. — (Обереги).
- Огородник, М. Під прихистком святого Миколая // Домашня газета. — 2016. — No. 28 (14 липня). — С. 8. — (Рідний край).
- Огородник, М. Немає нічого ріднішого як рідна Батьківщина... // Свобода. — 2017. — No. 39 (19 травня). — С. 2.
- Огородник, М. Погляд крізь століття... // Чортківський Вісник. — 2018. — No. 8 (16 березня). — С. 4. — (Краєзнавство).
- Огородник, М. Півтора століття під омофором Миколая Чудотворця // Наш день. — 2019. — No. 22 (4 червня). — С. 8. — (Духовність).
- Тимчук, Л. Святиня оберігає село // Сільський господар плюс Тернопільщина. — 2019. — No. 22 (5 червня). — С. 3.
