= Saint Mary Magdalene church, Shmankivtsi =

Church in Ternopil Oblast, Ukraine

Saint Mary Magdalene church Костел святої Марії Магдалини
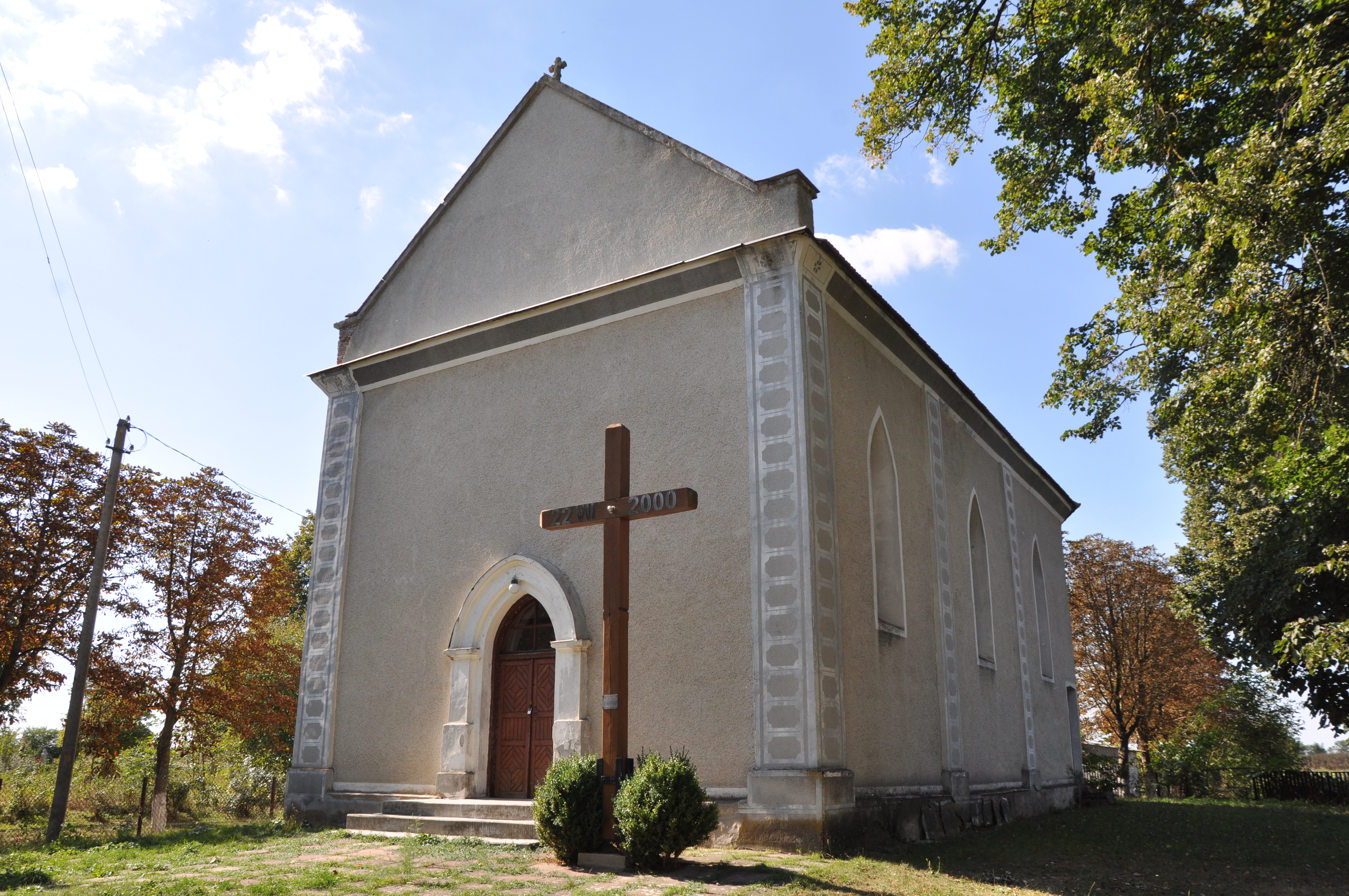

- Location within Ternopil Oblast

Religion
- Affiliation: Roman Catholic Church

Location
- Location: Shmankivtsi
- Interactive map of Saint Mary Magdalene church Костел святої Марії Магдалини
- Coordinates: 48°59′46″N 25°55′02″E

Saint Mary Magdalene church (Ukrainian: Костел святої Марії Магдалини) Roman Catholic Church (RCC) in Shmankivtsi of the Zavodske settlement hromada of the Chortkiv Raion of the Ternopil Oblast.

== History ==
According to unconfirmed data, in 1600 Dominican monks settled here, who in 1610 moved to Chortkiv. In 1912, the Dominican Fathers built and consecrated the branch church of the parish in Chortkiv (parish church — the church of St. Stanislaus) in Shmankivtsi at their own expense.

In Soviet times, the shrine was closed — it made a granary.

In 1986, the returned church was renovated. The parish has 7 members.

The church is cared for by Roman Catholic believers who serve in it.

== Description ==
The church is one-nave, brick, plastered, in its modest architecture there are neo-Gothic features (pointed ends of the entrance portal, windows). Each of the surfaces of the side facades is divided by two pilasters.

== Sources ==
- Костели і каплиці України
- Огородник, М. Історія костелу в Шманьківцях // Чортківський Вісник. — 2017. — № 44 (17 листопада). — С. 5. — (Розповідне).
