= Oak of Shashkevych, Shmankivtsi =

Botanical natural monument in Shmankivtsi, Ukraine

Coordinates: 48°59′30″N 25°55′14″E

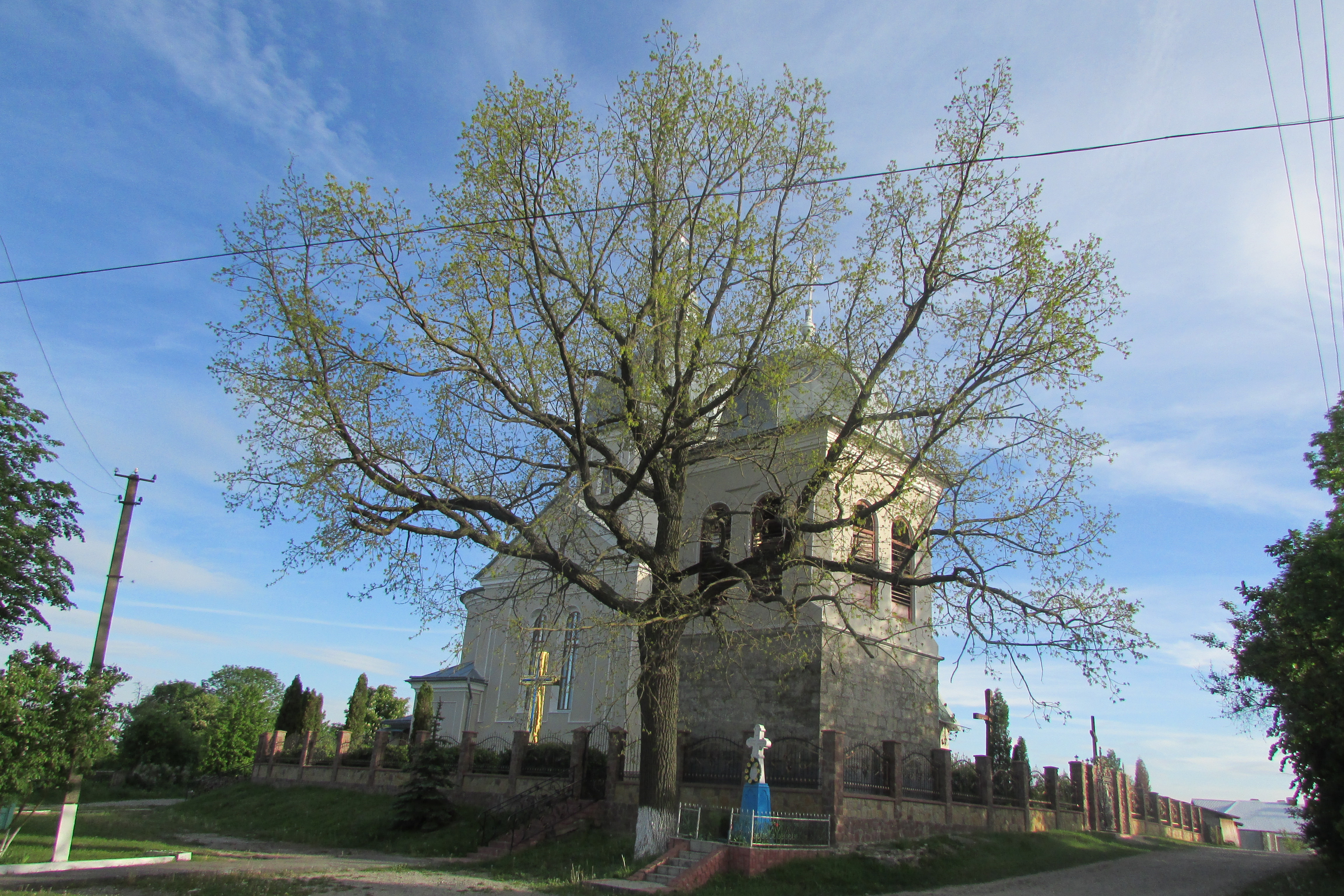
Oak of Shashkevych

Shashkevych Oak is a botanical natural monument of local significance in Ukraine, located in the village of Shmankivtsi, Chortkiv Raion, Ternopil Oblast, near the Orthodox Church.

== Sources ==
- Огородник, М. Дуб Маркіяна Шашкевича росте у Шманьківцях / Максим Огородник // Чортківський Вісник. — 2018. — № 10 (23 березня). — С. 4. — (З історії святинь).
- Реєстр природно-заповідного фонду Чортківського району // Управління екології та природних ресурсів Тернопільської ОДА.
