= Old Chortkiv Castle =

Lost defensive structure in Chortkiv, Ternopil Oblast, Ukraine

- Chortkiv, Chortkiv Raion, Ternopil Oblast
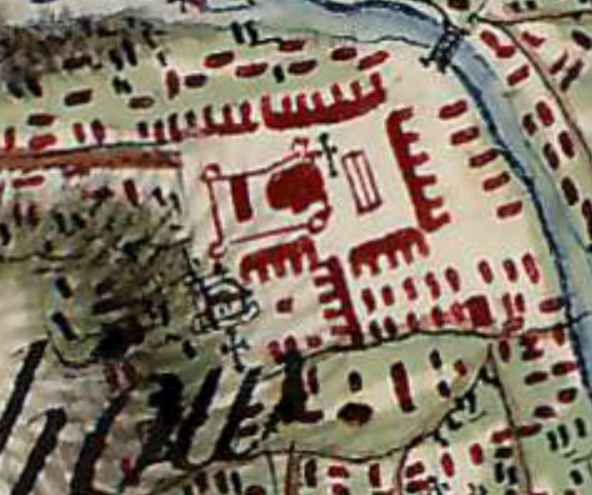
- Old Chortkiv Castle on von Mieg's map, 18th century.

Site information
- Owner: Ukraine
- Condition: ruined

Location
- Coordinates: 49°01′09″N 25°47′46″E

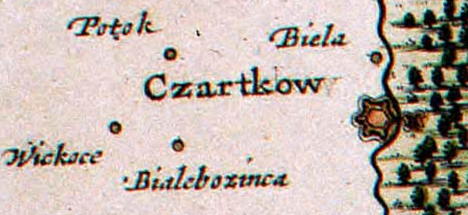
Chortkiv fortifications on the map of Guillaume de Beauplan

The Old Chortkiv Castle (Ukrainian: Старочортківський замок, romanized: Starochortkivs'kyi zamok) is the lost defensive structure in Chortkiv of the Chortkiv urban hromada of the Chortkiv Raion of Ternopil Oblast in Ukraine. The castle was part of the defense and fortification system of Chortkiv.

== History ==
It is marked on the map of Guillaume de Beauplan.

At the beginning of the 17th century, the castle had certain fortification shortcomings, in particular: rounded rondell towers whose walls could not withstand cannon fire with the development of artillery at the time. They quickly collapsed and did not provide reliable defense. It is likely that the eastern tower was damaged during the hostilities that took place in the city. Von Mieg's map clearly shows that the territory of the present cloister and Saint Stanislaus church was surrounded by a square stone wall, and that round rondell towers were located at the corners. In the 1760s the eastern tower was lost.

In one of his works, researcher Sadok Barącz notes that in the early 18th century the Dominican church and monastery were surrounded by a wall, to which many materials were transported during the dismantling of the castle in the village of Shmankivtsi, built in 1625.

In 2017, a study commissioned by the Dominican Order was conducted to establish and confirm the fact that the current Dominican Church was surrounded by a defensive wall, which was discovered in the western part of the church. It runs parallel to Stepana Bandera Street. The remains of this defensive wall partially preserved four loopholes that were cut into the wall every 2 meters.

From the beginning of the eighteenth century, the church and Dominican monastery could function inside the castle building. In the 20s and 30s of the eighteenth century, the construction of a baroque church with the addition of the Dominican monastery began, which, despite numerous appeals by the Eastern Galician Conservators Circle to the clergy and local authorities, destroyed the Old Chortkiv Castle.
