= Shmankivtsi Castle =

Lost defensive structure in Shmankivtsi, Ternopil Oblast, Ukraine

- Shmankivtsi', Chortkiv Raion Ternopil' Oblast'
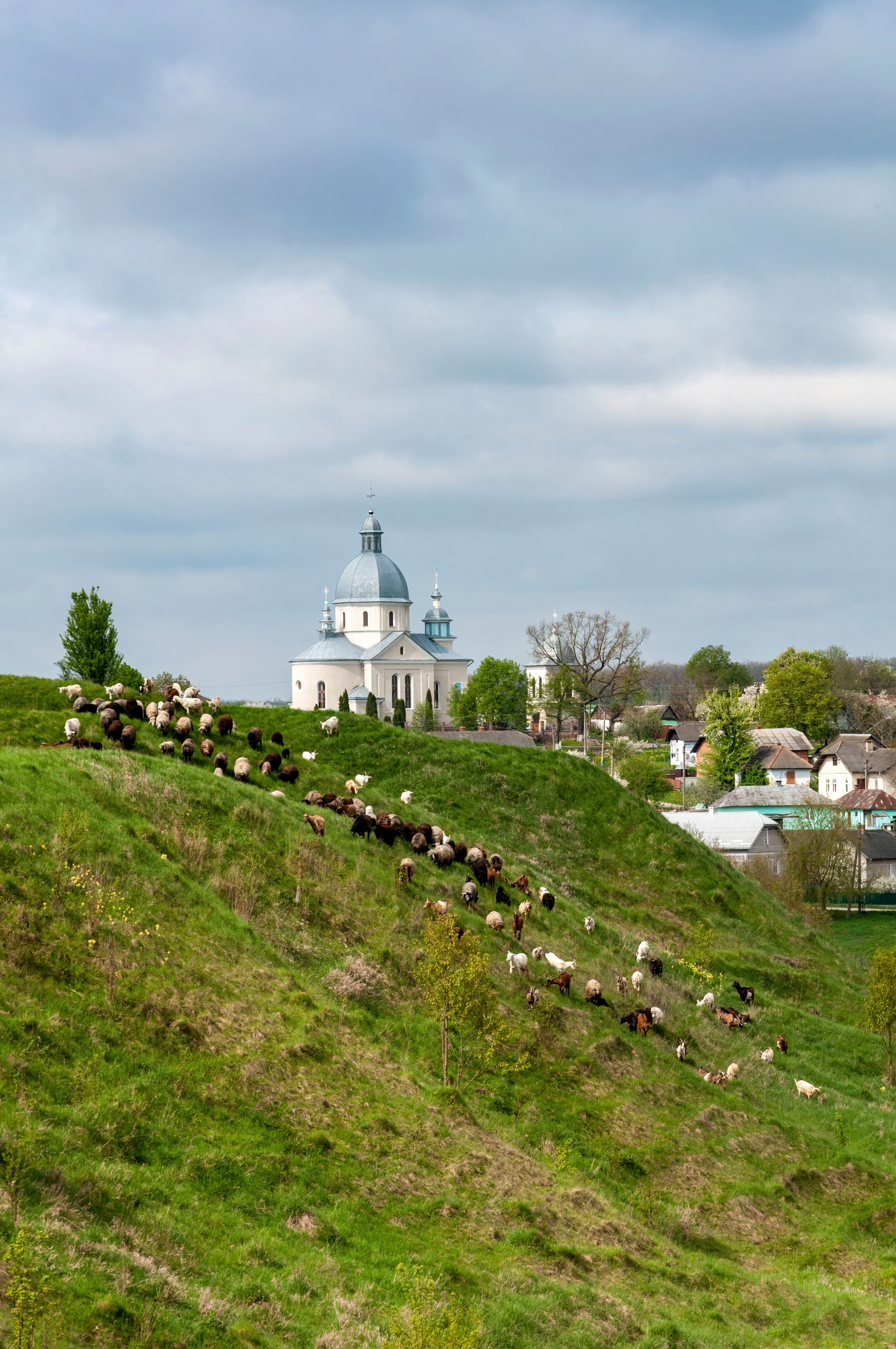
- Sheep graze on a cape-shaped hill where a wooden castle once stood

Site information
- Owner: Ukraine
- Condition: ruined

Location
- Coordinates: 48°59′34″N 25°55′36″E

Site history
- Events: Tatar invasions

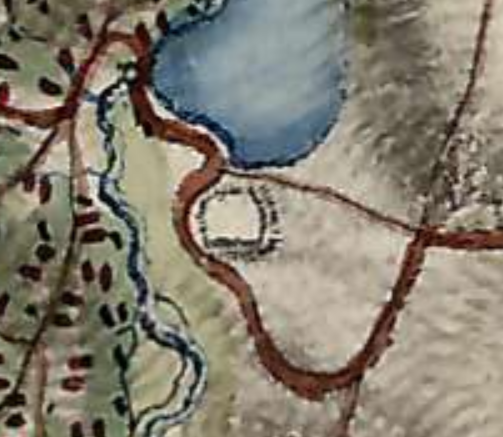
Castle on the map of Friedrich von Mig, XVIII century

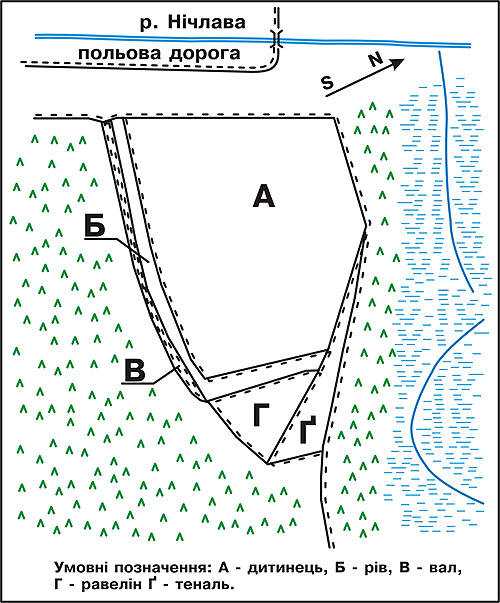
Plan-scheme of Shmankivtsi Castle

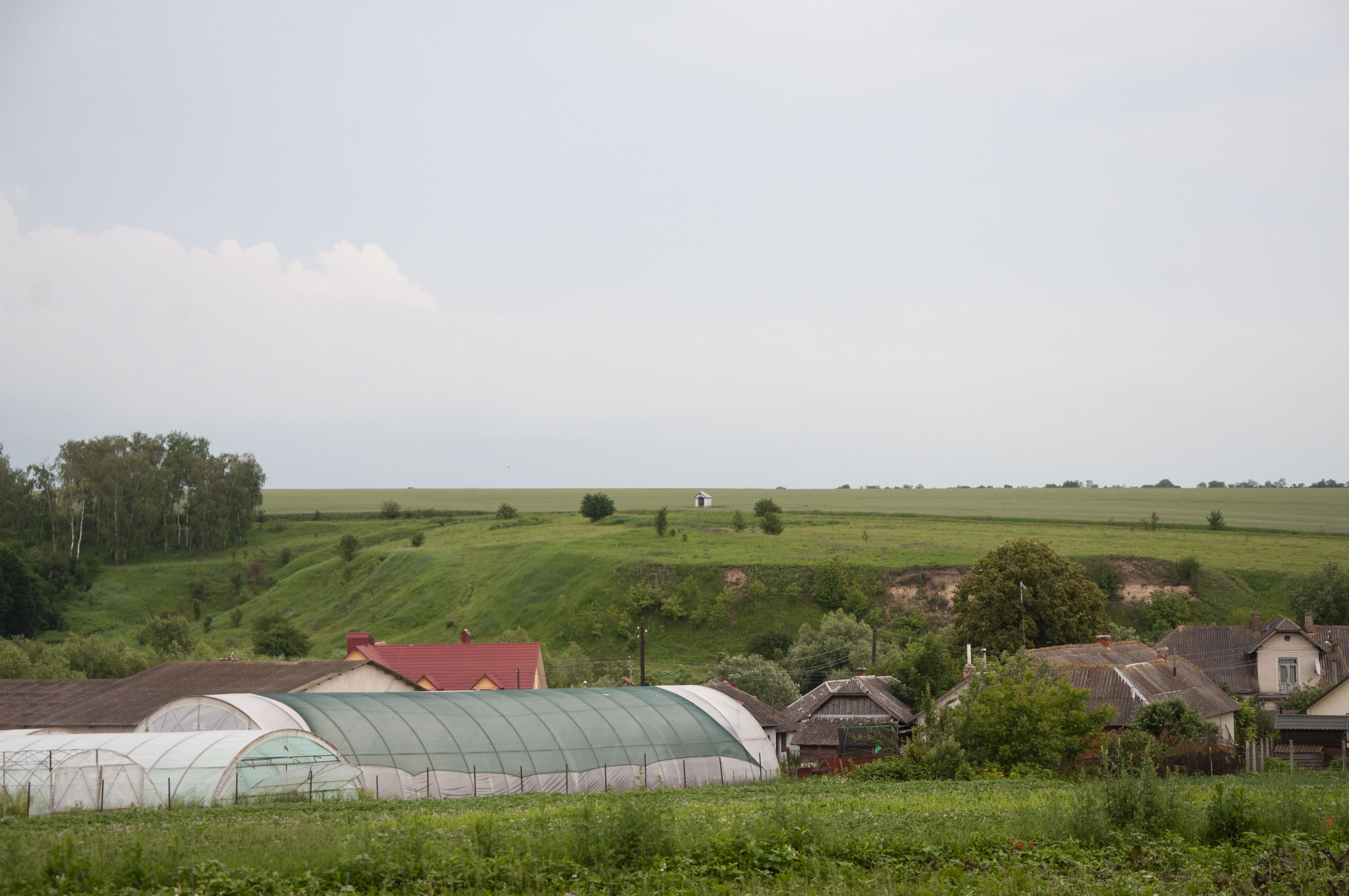
Shmankivtsi Castle and Castle Hill tract

The Shmankivtsi Castle (Ukrainian: Шманьківський замок, romanized: Shmankivs'kyi zamok) is a lost defensive structure in the village of Shmankivtsi, Zavodske settlement hromada, Chortkiv Raion, Ternopil Oblast, Ukraine.

The remains of the castle were discovered by archaeologist Volodymyr Dobrianskyi in the early 1990s during archeological excavations of antiquities in the Nichlava river basin. The castle site is included in the List of newly discovered cultural heritage sites (protection number 2088).

== History ==
On November 26, 1624, the Dominican monks from Chortkiv, together with Pavel Kelpinsky (Polish: Paweł Kełpiński), a neighbor of the village of Shmankivtsi, decided to build a castle to defend against the Tatars, monastery and kindergarten in Chortkiv.

The wooden castle is located on the eastern outskirts of the village. Shmankivtsi. It was built in the middle of the 17th century on the corner of an elongated slope 10-15 m high on the left bank of the Nichlava River, in the Zamkova Hora tract.

The castle had the shape of a pentagon, which in the western part of about 60 m had a steep slope (until recently there was a working quarry). An embankment was built in the eastern part of the castle.

Today, its height is about 1 m and width - up to 5 m. In the inner part of the baby, this shaft is flat, that is, it was an apron. This embankment is now escarped from the front side. According to surveys, over time, the land in this area gradually sank down, but in the XVII century. it was counter-scarped.

Below the level of the shaft, at a depth of 1 m, there is a triangular platform, resembling a ravelin. Its two side faces reach a length of 30 m. Down the slope, from the north-western corner of the ravelin, passes tenal. This defensive strip up to 1 m is deepened into the deluvial slope of the cape. On this tenal from the front in some areas the parapet poured from above is still traced. From the side of the front field there is a shaft up to 100 m long, which is connected near the ravelin with the second, raised shaft with an apron and a counterscarp in the eastern part of the castle. In some places the shaft reaches a height of 0.5–0.7 m. In front of it on the surface of the soil you can see a dug ditch, heavily leveled not only by time but also by deep plowing (until the early 1990s there was a field).

The western part of the hill was destroyed by a quarry, where in the wall of the cliff there are layers of ash and charcoal and found remains of pottery of the late XVII century. Probably in this part was the palace of the owner of the castle and outbuildings that burned down during the assault and siege. According to the fortification planning, there was to be an entrance to the castle, which passed through the dungeon. This part of the castle was lost because it was destroyed by the villagers.

== See also ==
- Chortkiv Castle (old)

== Sources ==
- Rąkowski, G. Podole. Przewodnik po Ukrainie Zachodniej. Część 2. — Pruszków : Oficyna Wydawnicza Rewasz, 2006. — 187 с. — ISBN 83-89188-46-5.
- Добрянський, В. Нові відкриття городищ XIV та XVII ст. і фортифікаційних споруд на Західному Поділлі // Замковий туризм Тернопільської області: проблеми і перспективи розвитку: Матер. Міжнар. наук.-практ. конф., Тернопіль: ТНПУ, 2012, s. 47—52.
- Добрянський, В. Дерев'яний замок у Шманьківцях «родом» з XVII століття // Голос народу. — 2013. — № 52 (20 груд.). — С. 5. — (Свідок давнини).
- Добрянський В. Нові дані про городища та фортифікаційні споруди на західному Поділлі // Археологічні студії. — Випуск 5. — Київ — Чернівці, 2014. — С. 361—362.
- Добрянський В. Про археологічне обстеження дерев'яного замку XVII ст. в селі Шманьківцях на Тернопільщині // Воєнна історія України. Галичина та Закарпаття / Наук. збірник (матеріали Всеукр. наук.-практ. конференції). — Ужгород, 2014. — 5—6 червня. — С. 46—48.
- Добрянський, В. Матеріали давньої історії Шманьковець та замку / Володимир Добрянський // Свобода плюс Тернопільщина. — 2021. — № 34 (7 травня). — С. 3. — (Акценти).
