= Stepan Charnetskyi =

Ukrainian poet (1881–1944)

- Степан Чарнецький
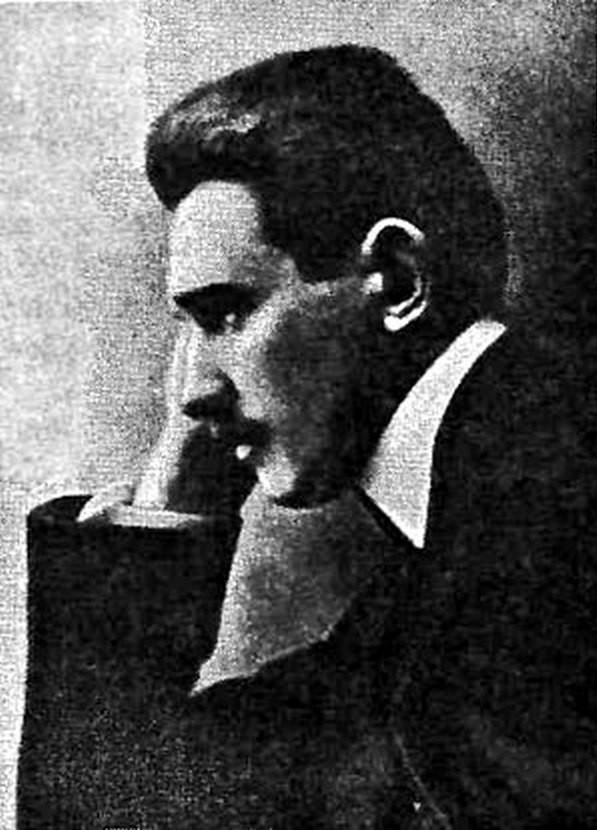
- Born: 21 January 1881; Shmankivtsi, Austria-Hungary (now Chortkiv Raion, Ternopil Oblast, Ukraine)
- Died: 2 October 1944 (aged 63); Lviv, Ukrainian SSR, Soviet Union (now Ukraine)

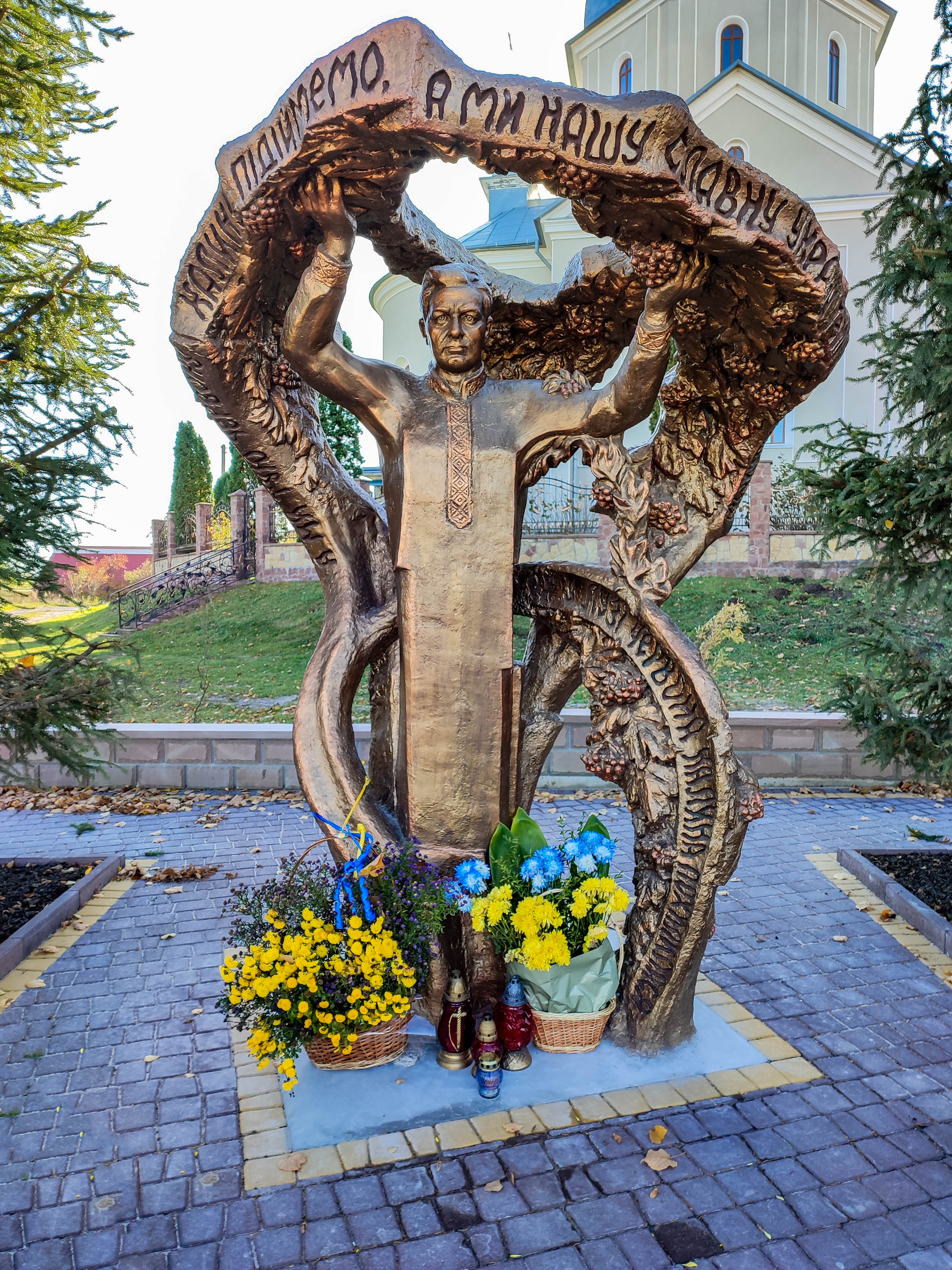
Statue of Stepan Charnetskyi in Shmankivtsi

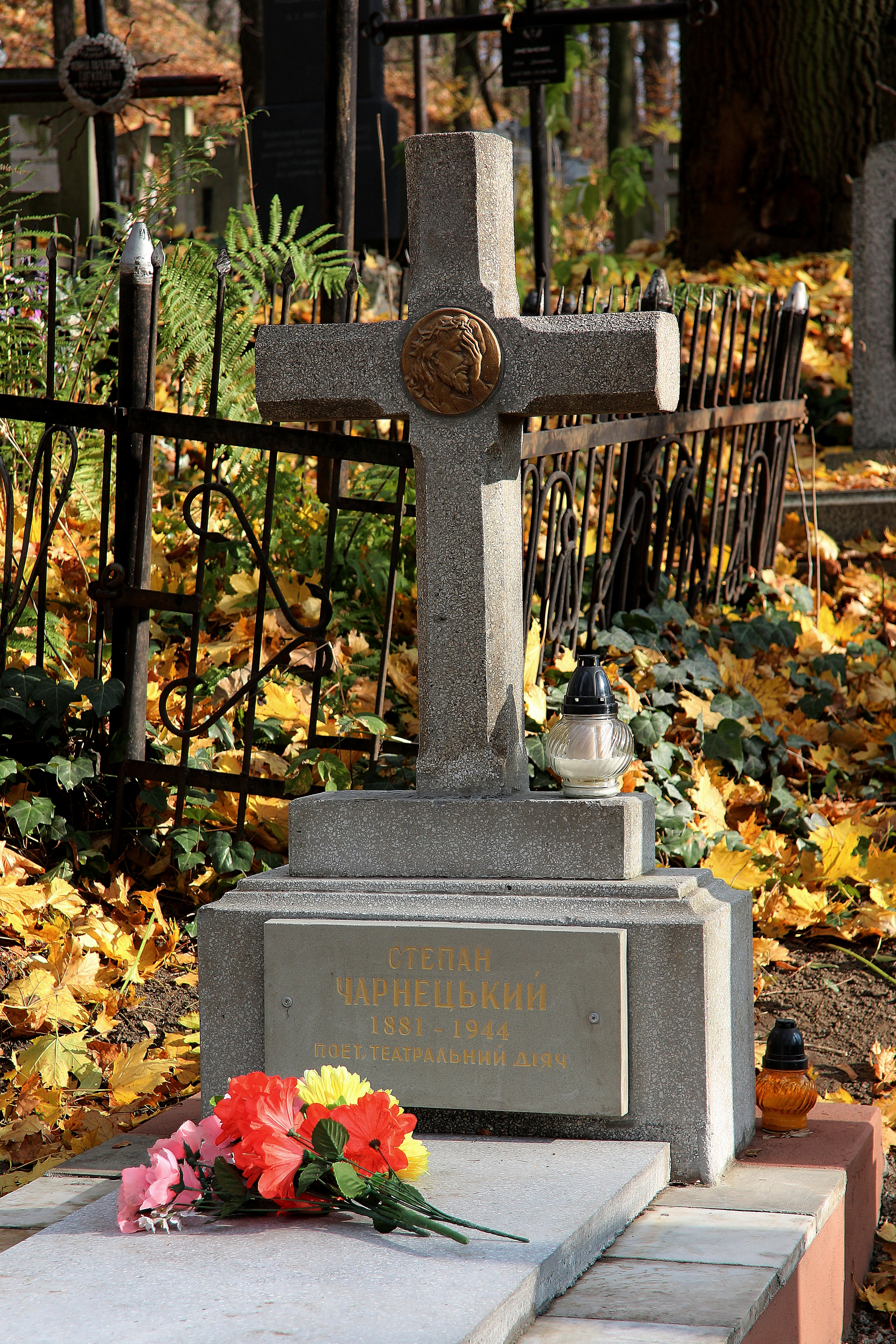
Tomb of Stepan Charnetskyi at the Lychakiv Cemetery in Lviv

Stepan Mykolaiovych Charnetskyi (Note: Also transliterated as Charnetsky) (Ukrainian: Степан Миколайович Чарнецький; Polish: Stepan Czarnecki; 21 January 1881 – 2 October 1944) was a Ukrainian poet, translator, journalist, theatre and music critic, and theatre director and producer, author of the anthem of the Ukrainian Sich Riflemen "Oi u luzi chervona kalyna".

== Biography ==
Charnetskyi was born 21 January 1881 in Shmankivtsi, Austria-Hungary (now in Chortkiv Raion, Ternopil Oblast, Ukraine). He was the thirteenth child in a priest family. His father was Greek Catholic priest Mykola Charnetskyi, who died of typhoid soon after his birth. His mother was Vladyslava Eckhardt-Charnetska.

He went to school in Stanyslaviv and then studied in Lviv's Tsisars-Royal Technical Academy (now Lviv Polytechnic National University). He then worked in Lviv as an engineer. During World War I, he was the Assistant Chief of the railway station No. 5 Lviv-Stryi, Lviv-Sambir.

He was one of the group of modernist writers in Austrian Ukraine known as the Moloda Muza (the Young Muse) that emerged in 1906, alongside Volodymyr Birchak, Mykhailo Yatskiv, Petro Karmanskyi, Ostap Lutskyi, Vasyl Pachovskyi, Osyp Turianskyi and Sydir Tverdokhlib.

He was the editor of the magazines Ukrainian Voice (1915) and Ukrainian Herald. He was the artistic director of the Ruska Besida Theatre (spring 1913-August 1914) in Lviv.

He married Iryna Popovachak-Charnetska and they had two daughters, Olesia and Oleksandra.

== Works ==
He wrote the patriotic anthem to the Ukrainian Sich Riflemen entitled "Oh, the Red Viburnum in the Meadow" (Ukrainian: Ой у лузі червона калина) (1913). Pink Floyd recorded a version of the song in 2022 as "Hey, Hey, Rise Up!".

His collections of poems included "В годині сумерку" (1908), "В годині задуми" (1917) and "Сумні ідем" (1920). He also wrote about the theatre, including the book "An Essay on the History of the Ukrainian Theater in Galicia" (1934).

In 1936, he co-wrote lyrics for the song "There Will Come Another Time" (Ukrainian: Прийде ще час) with Bohdan Vesolovskyi, who had previously composed the music.

He translated Adam Mickiewicz's 1828 narrative poem "Konrad Wallenrod" from the original Polish into Ukrainian. Some of Charnetskyi's own poetry was translated into Polish by Tverdokhlib.

== Family ==
Father, Mykola Charnetskyi (2 January 1830, place of birth unknown - 25 June 1882, Shmankivtsi, Austria-Hungary) - Ukrainian Greek Catholic priest, dean of the Chortkiv deanery of the UGCC. Ordained in 1854. He served in the parishes - the Exaltation of the Holy Cross of the Lord in the city of Kopychyntsi (1854-1855), the Assumption of the Blessed Virgin Mary in the village of Uhryn (1856-1868), the Saints Cosmas and Damian church of the village of Shmankivtsi-1882; all - Chortkiv Raion). Played the violin well. Together with his wife Vladyslava Eckhardt, they raised thirteen children, among whom the youngest was Stepan. Died 25 June 1882 of typhus, buried in the village cemetery Shmankivtsi.

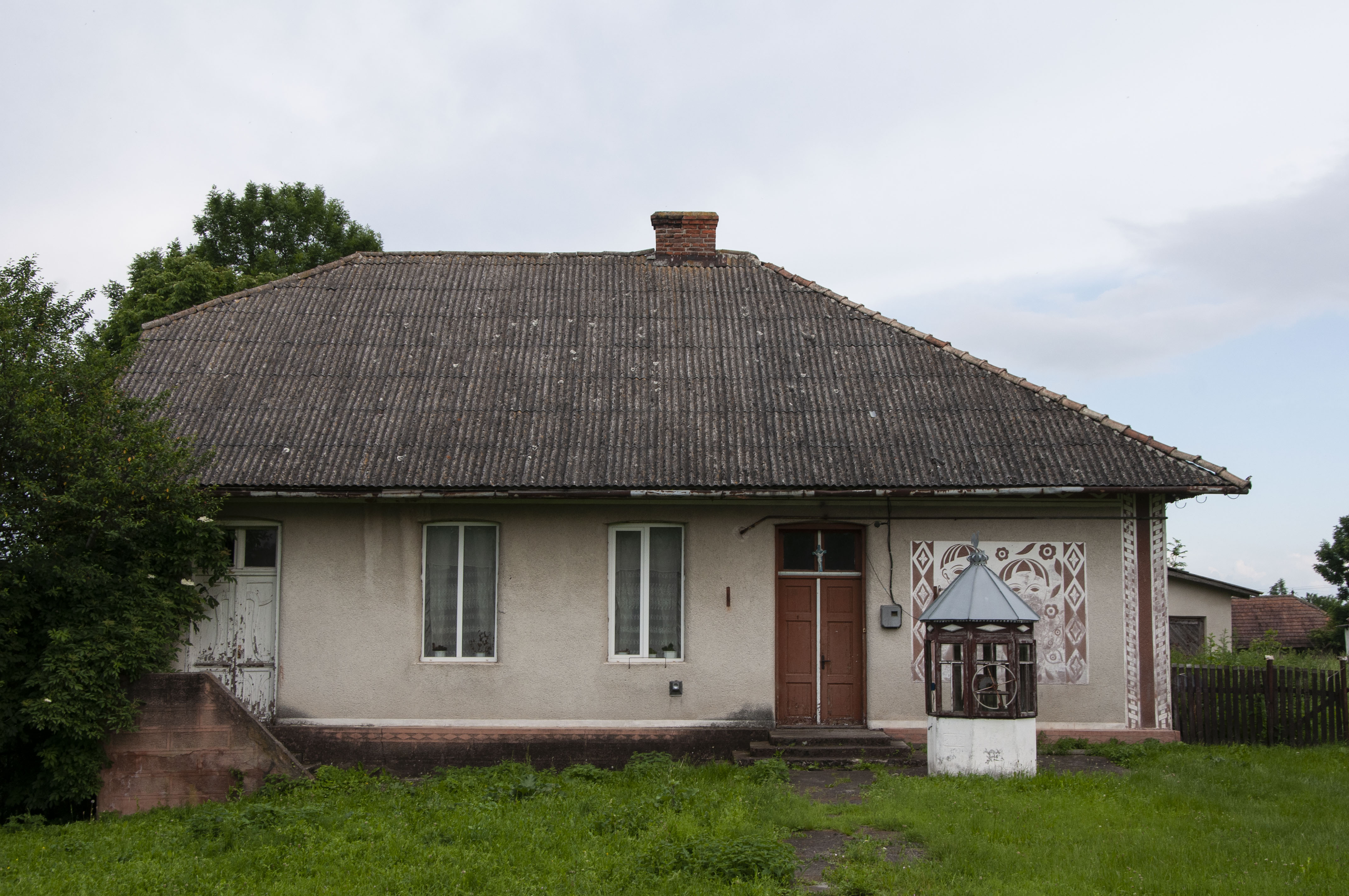
The house where Stepan Charnetskyi was born

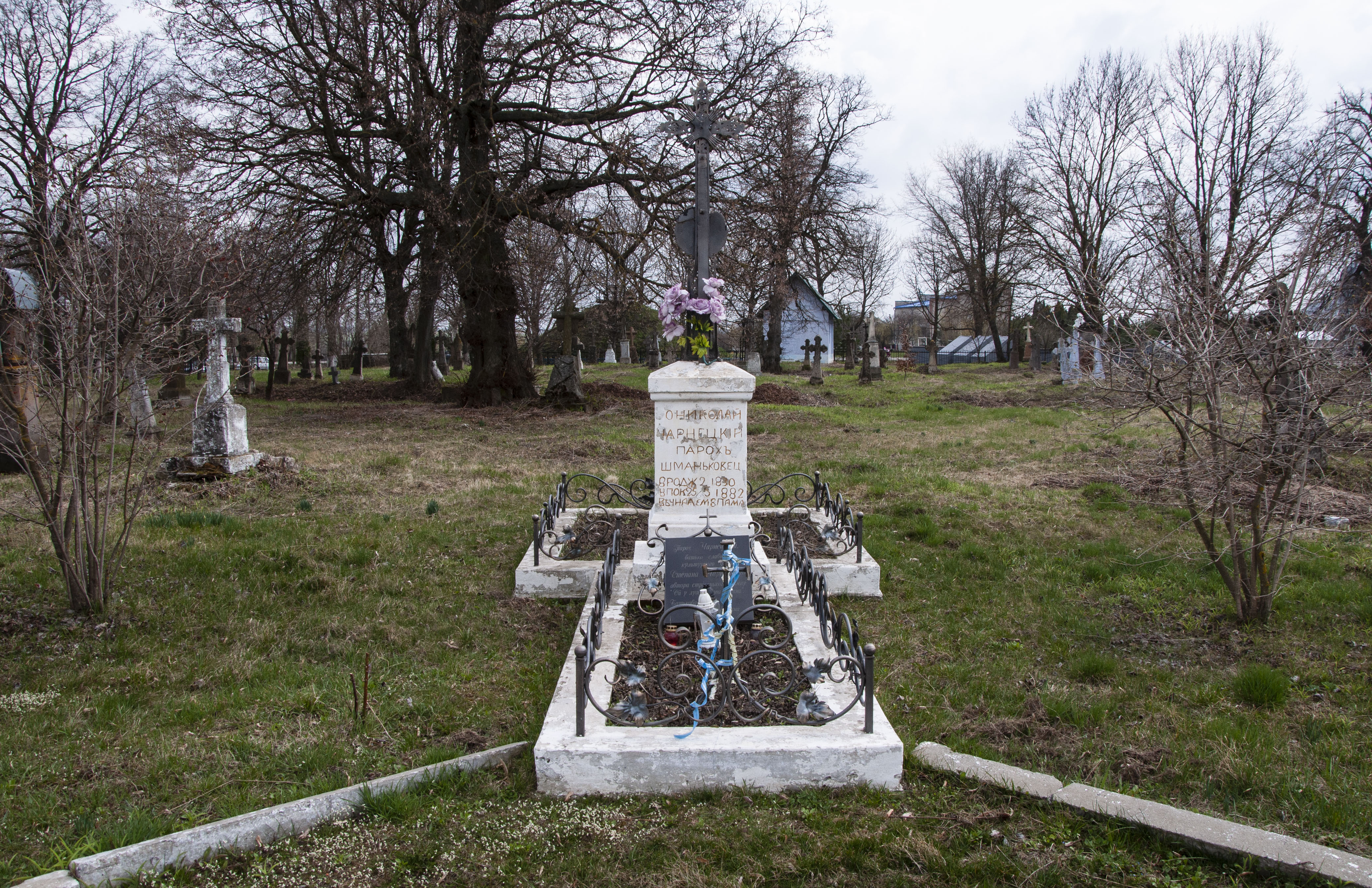
The grave of Mykola Charnetskyi, father of Stepan Charnetskyi in Shmankivtsi

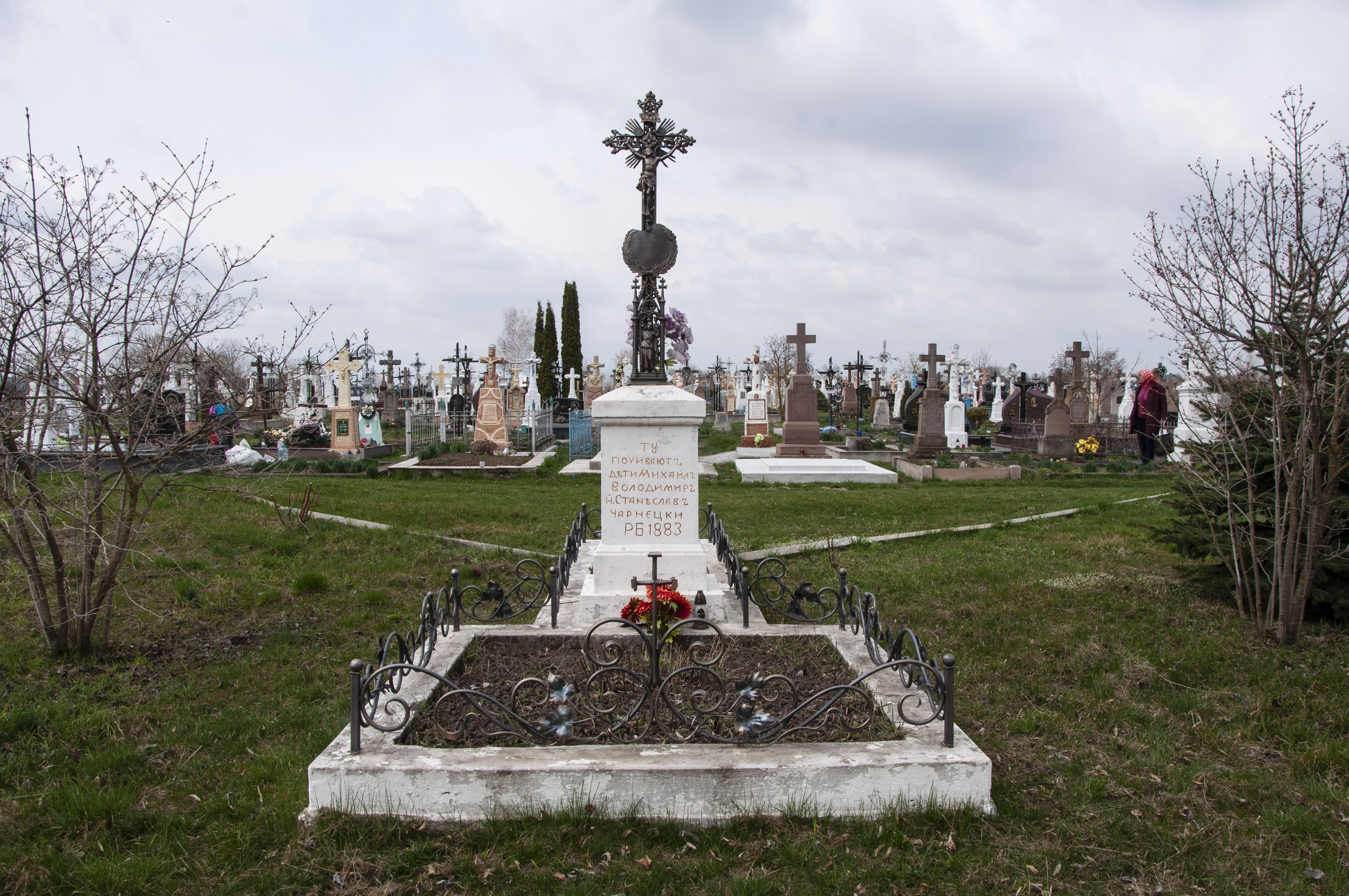
Tomb of Stepan Charnetskyi's brothers in Shmankivtsi

== Memorials ==
On 26 May 1991, a statue of Stepan Charnetskyi (sculptor Ivan Muliarchuk, initiator - Nadiia Protskiv) was unveiled in the poet's family village.

In 2005, Nadiia Morykvas published the book "Melankholiia of Stepan Charnetskyi". It tells about the difficult and even tragic fate of Stepan Charnetskyi. The book uses archival materials, memoirs of the poet's contemporaries, including his daughter Alexandra.

Every year the family village hosts commemorative events in honor of the poet, in particular the regional art festival "Chervona kalyna".

== See also ==
- Kateryna Rubchakova
