= Statue of Stepan Charnetskyi, Shmankivtsi =

Monument in Shmankivtsi, Ukraine

Statue of Stepan Charnetskyi
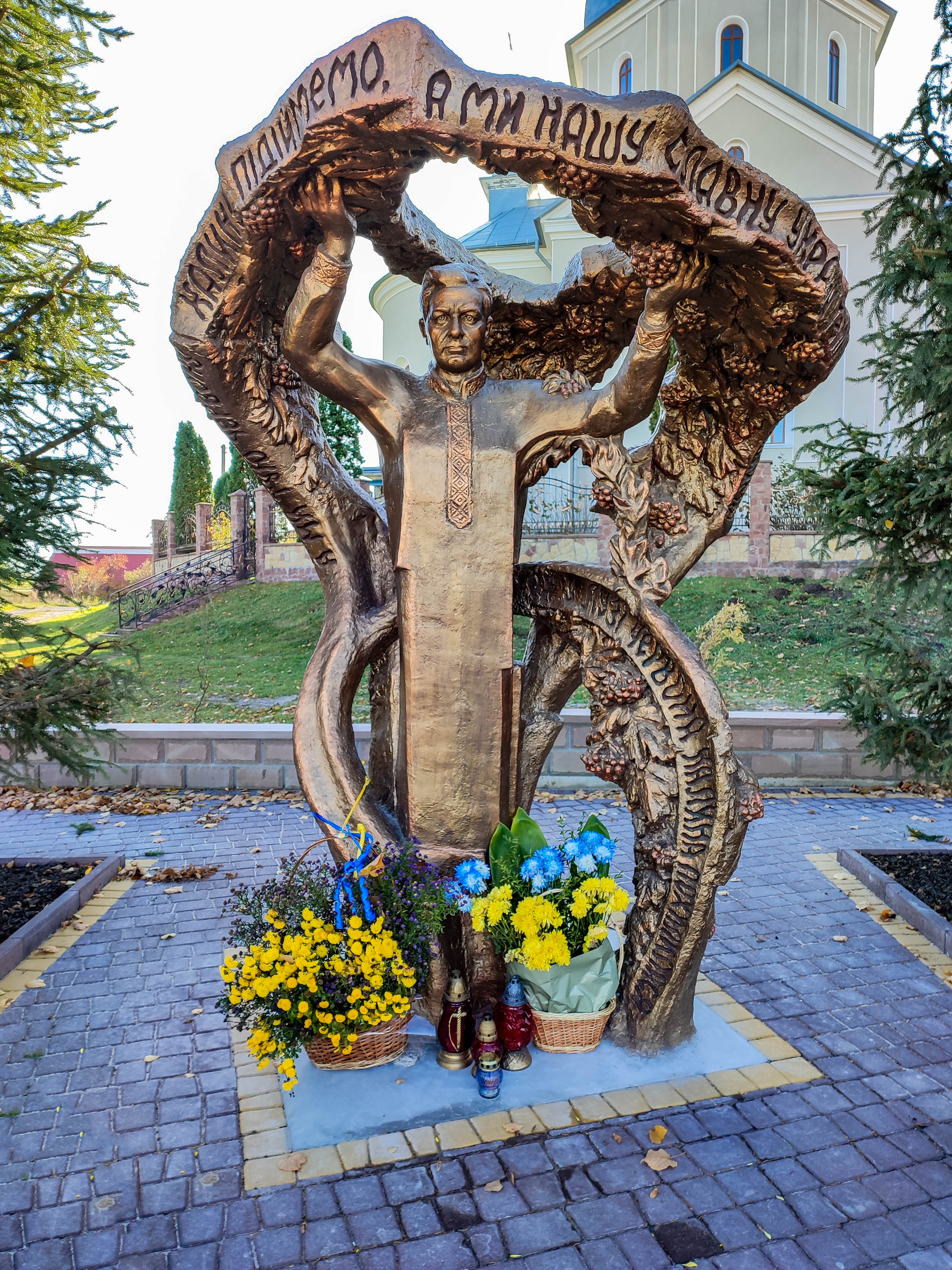
- Completion date: 26 May 1991
- Type: statue
- Location: Shmankivtsi, Ternopil Oblast, Ukraine; 48°59′29.9″N 25°55′15.0″E

The statue of Stepan Charnetskyi (Ukrainian: Пам'ятник Степанові Чарнецькому) is a monument to the prominent poet and theater critic Stepan Charnetskyi. It is located in the village of Shmankivtsi, Zavodske Hromada, Chortkiv Raion, Ternopil Oblast, next to the Orthodox Church.

It has been declared a monument of monumental art of local importance (protection number 2986).

== Description ==
The monument is in the form of a large viburnum bush that has bent its branches.

== Information ==
The sculptor is Ivan Muliarchuk; the initiator of the installation is Nadiia Protskiv. The grand opening took place on 26 May 1991 during the first Chervona kalyna festival.

In June 2012, after a severe storm, an old linden tree fell on the monument and the left arm dropped. The damaged pedestal was restored by sculptor and artist Dmytro Muliarchuk (son of Ivan Muliarchuk). In the spring of 2022, Mr. Muliarchuk repainted the monument.

Every year, on Stepan Charnetskyi's birthday, celebrations are held near the monument.
