= Lysenia Cave =

Solutional cave system in Shmankivtsi, Ukraine

Lysenia
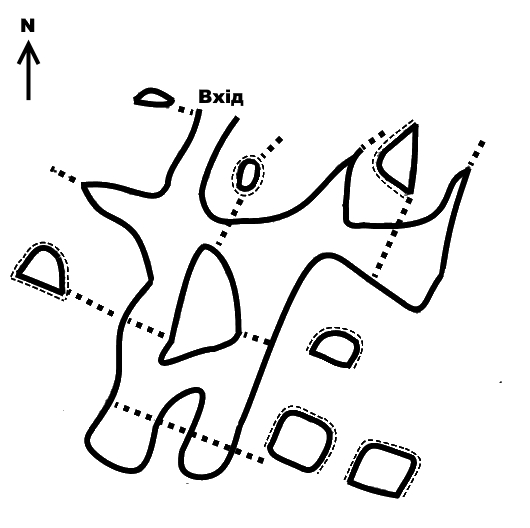
- Lysenia Cave plan-scheme
- Interactive map of Lysenia
- Location: Shmankivtsi, Zavodske settlement hromada, Chortkiv Raion, Ternopil Oblast, Ukraine
- Coordinates: 48°58′46″N 25°56′36″E
- Length: 34 km (21 mi)
- Discovery: 1965
- Geology: solutional cave

Lysenia Cave is a cavern in the village of Shmankivtsi, Chortkiv Raion, Ternopil Oblast, Ukraine.

== General characteristics ==
Cadastral number - No. 27, registered in the Ternopil Speleological Club "Podillia".

The cave has been known since ancient times. The description and survey were made on April 27, 1965 by speleologists of the Ternopil club "Podillya" Serhii Budennyi, Valentyna Piatapal, Ihor Martynyshyn.

By type the cavity is labyrinthine and erosive-corrosive.

The entrance to the cave was located on the northern slope of a small ravine on the left bank of the river Nichlava. Azimuth binding is the church with. Shmankivchyky - 305 ° at a distance of 2 kilometers.

The total length of the passages is 34 m, its area is 46 km and the volume is 70 m. The width of the passages in the cave is from 0.9 to 2.5 m, and the height from 0.5 to 1.8 meters.

=== The Discovery of the Cave ===
In the summer of 2023, a scientific and research geodesy team led by geodesist Anatolii Vivat rediscovered Lysenia Cave, which had been explored as far back as 1965 but was later considered lost because its entrance had been buried by soil. The search team combined archival materials (including research by archaeologist Volodymyr Dobrianskyi), tips from experienced speleologist Volodymyr Snihur ("Papa"), assistance from local resident Yaroslav Polishchuk, and modern surveying technologies (GNSS receivers, ground-penetrating radar, and 3D laser scanning). Taking into account changes in the Earth’s magnetic field over time and performing mathematical calculations based on a reference landmark — the church in Shmankivtsi — the researchers managed to clear the buried entrance and precisely confirm that the discovery matched the old measurements (azimuth 305° and a distance of about 2 km). In addition to discovering the Lysenya Cave — whose coordinates were refined to place it within the territory of the village of Kolyndiany, Chortkiv Raion – the researchers stumbled upon another previously unknown underground cavity featuring exposed geological dikes and an archaeological layer.

== Description ==
The cave is laid in gray sandstone of gray hue, it is horizontal, there are no cracks in the ceiling and walls. According to the genesis of formation, this cavity is of the corrosion-suffusion type. Clay deposits were observed at the bottom. In cross section it is flat, sometimes domed, had three dead ends, which fell sharply, but their end is not traced.

The cave is wet, but did not have constant watercourses, which has its own constant microclimatic regime, except for the entrance, which depended on weather conditions and seasons. Refers to small caves, which are most often inhabited in ancient times by man. Unfortunately, the entrance to the cave was now covered with soil, which gradually sank down in the process of water erosion.
