= Ilarion Hrabovych =

Ukrainian poet, literary figure, publicist, teacher

- Іларіон Грабович
- Born: 18 June 1856; Shmankivtsi, now Chortkiv Raion, Ternopil Oblast
- Died: 11 August 1903 (aged 47); Lviv
- Education: Lviv University

Ilarion Mykhailovych Hrabovych (Ukrainian: Іларіон Михайлович Грабович, June 18, 1856, Shmankivtsi, now Chortkiv Raion, Ternopil Oblast - July 11/24, 1903, Lviv) was a Ukrainian poet, literary figure, publicist, teacher.

== Biography ==
He was born on June 18, 1856, into a family of a teacher in the village of Shmankivtsi (Chortkiv district, Kingdom of Galicia and Lodomeria, Austrian Empire, now Chortkiv Raion, Ternopil Oblast, Ukraine). He graduated from the Faculty of Philosophy at Lviv University in 1884 and became a teacher by profession. He taught at various high schools in Buchach, Sambir, and Lviv. According to some sources he died on July 11, 1903 while others report his death as occurring on July 24, 1903 in Lviv (Kingdom of Galicia and Lodomeria, Austria-Hungary, now Lviv region, Ukraine). He was buried on the 31st floor of Lychakiv Cemetery, but his grave is not preserved.

== Legacy ==
He began writing in the mid-1870s. And was the author of a short historical novel, essays and poetry. He worked for several magazines including Zoria, Dila, Svitu, and other magazines.

The most famous works:

- "Marta Boretska" (novel, 1880, adaptation of N. Karamzin's novel "Martha Posadnytsia, or the conquest of Novgorod"),
- "A Brief History of Novgorod" (1880),
- "The Best Easter" (autobiographical story, 1882),
- "The Cursed Dungeon",
- "Choice of Poetry" (collection of poems; Lviv, 1905).

== Sources ==
- Легка О. Грабович Іляріон (Ілярій, Іларіон) Михайлович // Франківська енциклопедія : у 7 т. / редкол.: М. Жулинський, Є. Нахлік, А. Швець та ін. — Львів : Світ, 2016. — Т. 1 : А — Ж / наук. ред. і упоряд. Є. Нахлік; передмова М. Жулинський, Є. Нахлік. — С. 427–428. — ISBN 978-966-914-034-0.
- Пиндус Б., Ткачов С. Грабович Іларіон Михайлович // Тернопільський енциклопедичний словник : у 4 т. / редкол.: Г. Яворський та ін. — Тернопіль : Видавничо-поліграфічний комбінат «Збруч», 2004. — Т. 1 : А — Й. — С. 409. — ISBN 966-528-197-6.
- Струни. Т. 2. — 1922.
