= Battle of Shmankivtsi =

The Battle of Shmankivtsi took place between the troops of the Polish–Lithuanian Commonwealth and the Ottoman Empire near the village of Shmankivtsi (now Chortkiv Raion, Ternopil Oblast, Ukraine). It ended with the victory of the combined forces of the Commonwealth.

== Sources ==
- Тимів І. Напад татар на Поділля і Прикарпаття взимку 1624 р. // Наукові записки з української історії: збірник наукових статей. — 2015. — Вип. 37. — С. 13—16.
- Diariusze o walkach z Tatarami. Rozprawa szczęśliwa z Tatary Jego Mości Pana Stanisława Koniecpolskiego Hetmana Polnego Koronnego na Podolu pod Szymańkowcami w roku 1624, 6 Februarii / wyd. A. Czołowski // Kwartalnik Historyczny. — 1892. — R. VI. — S. 97—99. (in Polish)
- Horn M. Chronologia i zasięg najazdów tatarskich na ziemie Rzeczypospolitej Polskiej w latach 1600-1647. — Białystok, 1962. — S. 45. (in Polish)
- Korzon T. Dzieje wojen i wojskowości w Polsce. Epoka pzedrozbiorowa. — T. IІ. — Warszawa-Kraków-Lwów, 1923. — S. 219. (in Polish)
- Podhorodecki L. Chanat Krymski i jego stosunki z Polską w XV-XVIII w. — Warszawa, 1987. — S. 142—143. (in Polish)
- Podhorodecki L. Stanisław Koniecpolski. — Warszawa, 1978. — S. 117—120. (in Polish)
- Żurkowski S. Żywot Tomasza Zamoyskiego kanclerza wielkiego koronnego. — Lwów, 1860. — S. 93—94. (in Polish)
