= Samets (tributary of Nichlavka) =

Stream in Ukraine

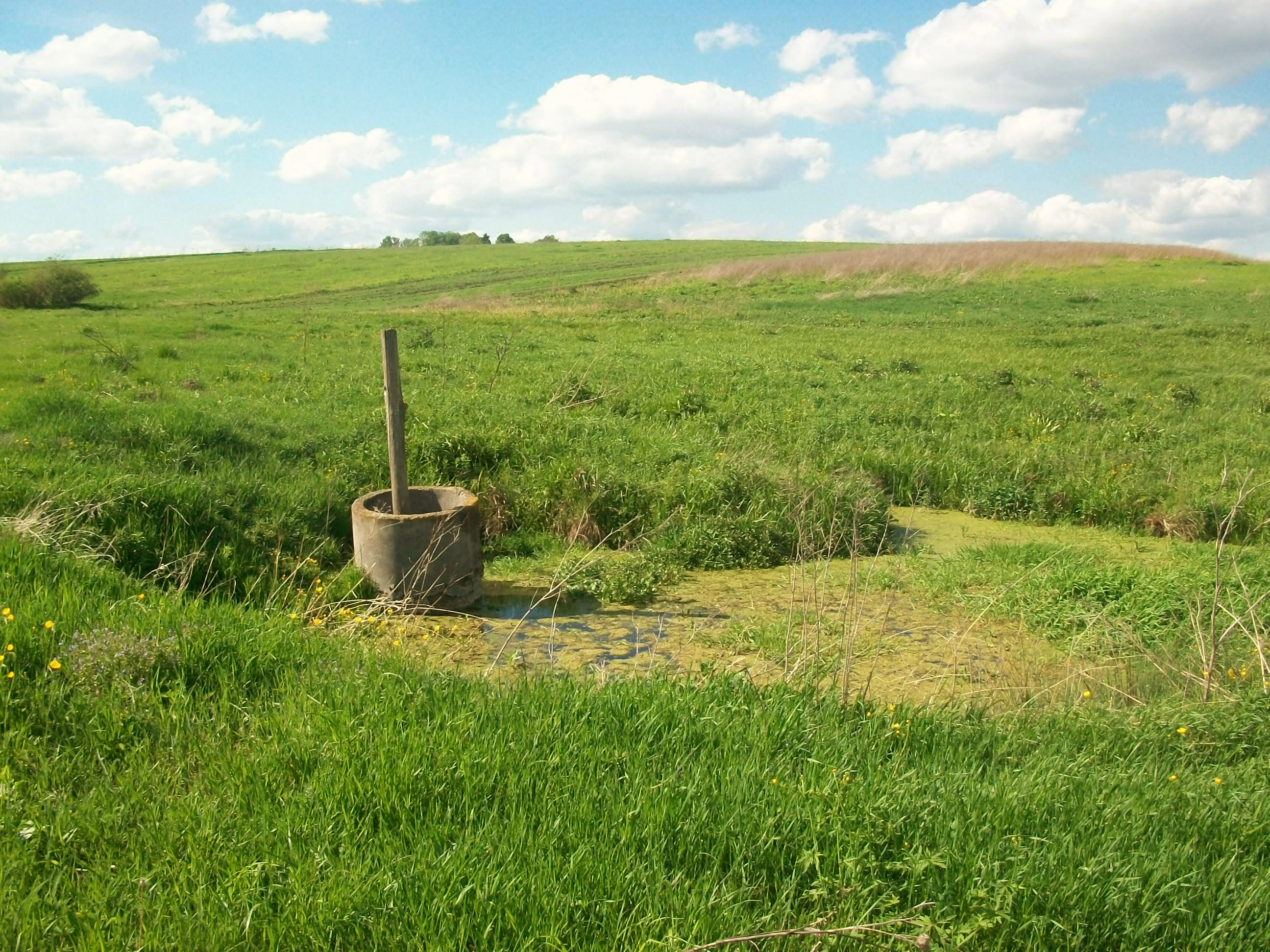
- Samets
- Native name: Самець (Ukrainian)

Location
- Country: Ukraine

Physical characteristics
- Source
  - location: Shmankivtsi
  - coordinates: 48°59′35.98″N 25°54′42.84″E
- Mouth: Nichlavka
  - coordinates: 48°59′17.95″N 25°55′38.3″E
- Length: 1.5 km (0.93 mi)

Samets is a stream 1.5 km long and 2 m wide, which flows within the village Shmankivtsi, Chortkiv Raion, Ternopil Oblast, flows into the river Nichlavka. Depicted on the map of von Mig of the 18th century.

There are four ponds and one waterfall on the shores, all of which are man-made.

Strilka Street stretches parallel to the stream.

It originates on the western outskirts of the village, flows to the southeast, bypassing the village. Strilka Street stretches parallel to the stream. It crosses Shevchenko Street and flows into Nichlavka near the bridge.

== Legend ==
The ancients tell the following legend: "Once a gentleman who probably lived in this village was riding a horse-drawn carriage past him, but suddenly the carriage overturned in the swamp and he drowned".

== Sources ==
- "Strosówka". Geographical Dictionary of the Kingdom of Poland (in Polish). 11. Warszawa: Kasa im. Józefa Mianowskiego. 1890. p. 409.
