= Shmankivtsi =

Shmankivtsi Шманьківці
- Village
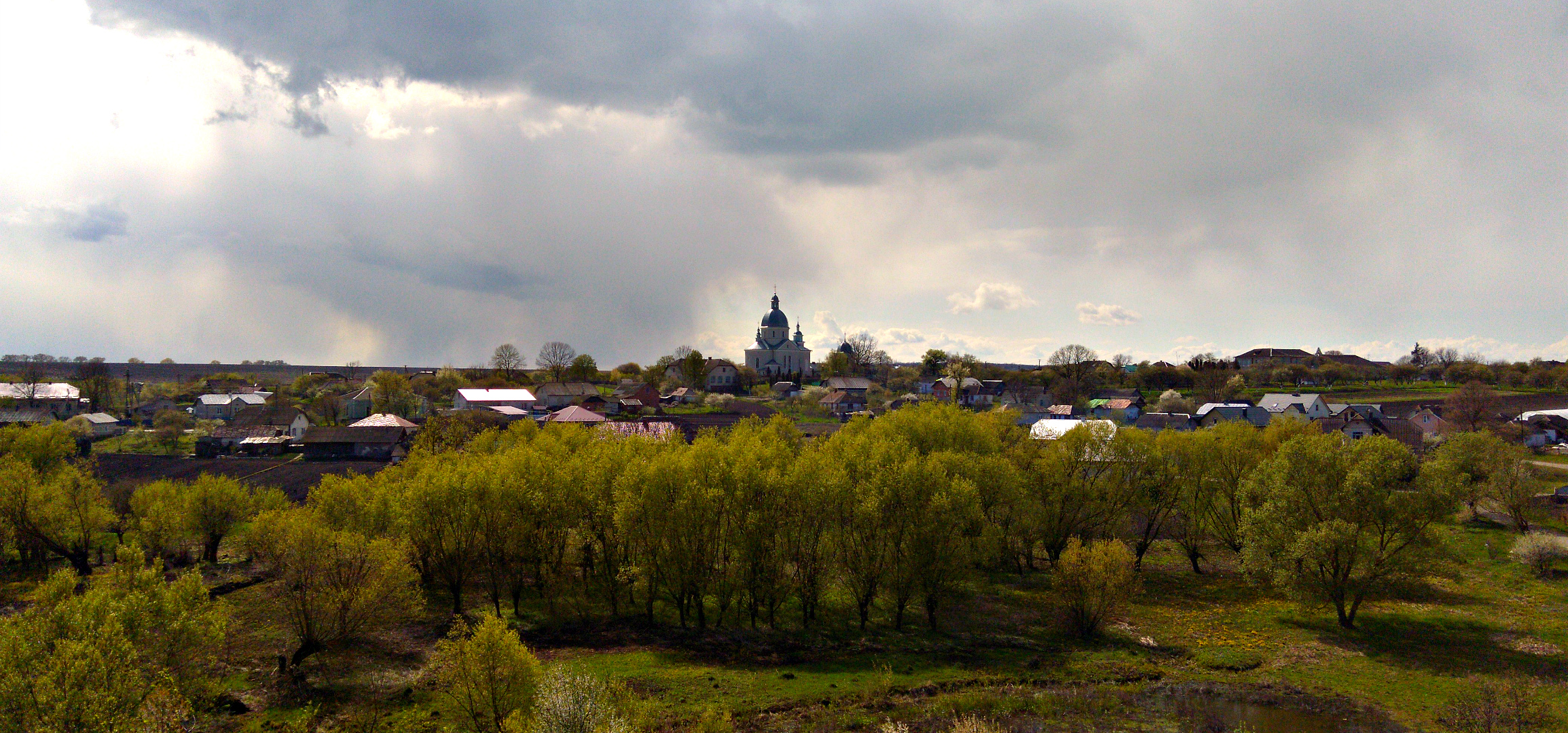
- View of the village from Shmankivtsi Castle
- Interactive map of Shmankivtsi
- Location in Ternopil Oblast Shmankivtsi (Ukraine)
- Coordinates: 48°59′35″N 25°55′03″E
- Country: Ukraine
- Oblast: Ternopil Oblast
- Raion: Chortkiv Raion
- Hromada: Zavodske settlement hromada

Population (2021)
  - Total: 665
- Time zone: UTC+2 (EET)
  - Summer (DST): UTC+3 (EEST)
- Postal code: 48580

Shmankivtsi (Ukrainian: Шманьківці, Polish: Szmańkowce) is a village in Ukraine, Ternopil Oblast, Chortkiv Raion, Zavodske settlement hromada. It is the administrative center of the former Shmankivtsi Village Council. Additionally, the village encompasses the former locality of Strusivka, which formed in the 18th century, possibly by the a member of the Struś coat of arms.

== Geography ==
It is located on the right bank of the river Nichlavka (right tributary of the Nichlava, Dniester basin), 12 km (7.5 mi) from the district center and 2 km (1.2 mi) from the nearest railway station Shmankivchyky. Its geographic coordinates are 48° 59' north latitude and 25° 55' east longitude. The average height above sea level is 280 m (920 ft). The territory is 2.27 km^{2} (0.88 sq mi), and contains 268 households.

Nearby is the Samets stream, which flows into the Nichlava, and the northern border of the village is touched by the Stavky stream (the right tributary of the Nichlava).

== Toponymy ==
Leading specialist in Ukrainian onomastics, Doctor of Philology, Professor of Lviv University Mykhailo Khudash in his monograph "Origin of Ukrainian Carpathian and Carpathian names of settlements (anthroponymic formations)" noted that the original meaning was Shmaikivtsi, meaning 'family or subjects Shmaika'. That is, the original name of the village was Shmaikivtsi, which later grew into Shmankivka due to the pronunciation of the letter y changing to n. A direct analogue of this is the Ukrainian equivalent of the name Shmaiko.

Mykola Krykun gives the following variants of the names of the village Shmankivtsi, recorded in chronological order in the relevant sources:

- Szmankowce, s. – Kamyanets Zemstvo Book 1617, 1642;
- Szmankowce, s. – Lifting register 1629, 1650 1661, 1667;
- Szmankowce, s. – General Register 1662;
- Szmankowce, s. – Commissioner's Register 1678;
- Czerminkofce, s. – Boplan.

== History ==
=== Ancient times ===
Antiquities of the Trypillia culture (4000 – 3000 BC), the Noah culture (14th – 11th centuries BC), the Holigrady culture (11th – 7th centuries BC), Chernyakhov culture (2nd – 5th centuries AD) and the Luka-Raikovetska culture (7th – 10th centuries AD), settlements and an ancient burial ground were found in the village. The medieval period is associated with the discovery of various bronze and silver jewellery, including rings, beads, necklaces, and tiara plaques, dating from the 16th–17th centuries.

=== Middle Ages and the modern day ===
In a multi-volume edition of records which were in the archives of the Bernardine monastery in Lviv, is the first known mention of the village Shmankivtsi. According to the act of 16 July 1449, which was registered in Terebovlia, Zimgund Kerdei received the above-mentioned village.

In 1469 there was a revision of the deeds of possession of property in Kievan Rus'.

According to the 1563–1564 tax register, an Orthodox church owned by Lanckoroński was recorded in Shmankivtsi.

On 29 September 1485, the Polish King and Grand Duke of Lithuania Casimir IV Jagiellon issued a deed confirming the sale by Jan Freder of Pleszewicz to the Buczacki brothers of half the village of Shmankivtsi in Skal County on the Sarnek River for 200 hryvnias and two horses worth 50 hryvnias; the settlement was acquired by the Buczacki brother magnates of the coat of arms of Abdank.

In 1609, the Rus' voivode Stanisław Golski gave Marcin Makowiecki a folwark in Shmankivtsi, the smaller halves that Makowiecki occupied under the right of life from Mikołaj Buczacki.

On 22 February 1610, the Rus' voivode and bar elder Stanisław Golski, having invited the Dominican monks of Shmankivtsi, founded a Dominican monastery with a church called the Blessed Virgin Mary and St. Stanislaus in Chortkiv. The monastery was allocated a large part of the village of Shmankivtsi with rates: the first, Mlynsky; the second, at the Court; the third, Stone; the fourth, Maciejewski; and the fifth, Demianovskyi. Stanislaw Liantskoronski from Brzez and Jan and Mykola Potocki from Potok also gave the monastery their units in this village. On 3 February 1622, the Dominicans received another piece of Shmankivtsi land as a gift from Jan and Mykola Potocki.

In 1623, Zofia of Brzez, wife of Mykola Churyl of Goraj, sister and heiress of the Podolsk voivode Stanislaw Liantskoronski, ceded her ancestral estates to the village of Shmankivtsi, smaller and larger, and Shvaikivtsi to Paweł Kełpiński and his heirs.

On 6 February 1624, a battle took place near Shmankivtsi between the Polish army under the command of Stanislaw Koniecpolski and the Tatar horde.

On 26 November 1624, Dominican monks from Chortkiv, together with Paweł Kełpiński, a neighbor of the village of Shmankivtsi, decided to build a castle here to defend against the Tatars, which in the next century was dismantled and the material was used to build walls around the church, monastery and garden in Chortkiv. In 1624, all the treasures from the Shmankivtsi monastery were transferred to Chortkiv.

In 1627, Paweł Kełpiński ceded his estates to the Łuków hunter Marcin Makowiecki. In 1644, Gabriel Kełpiński, son of Marcin, ceded his estates to Shmankivtsi, located in Kamianets County, Podil Voivodeship, which he inherited after the death of his brother Paul in its entirety and with all benefits, in favor of Krzysztof Kełpiński and his legal heirs; all processes on his part were released and the act of donation was confirmed by an oath. In 1653, Wacław Kełpiński, son of Stanisław and brother of Jan Kełpiński, his estates in the village of Shmankivtsi and other immovable and movable property, which he inherited from his father and mother and from his brother, were ceded to his cousins Adam and Felicjan Kełpiński. Claims for those estates were waived and the deed of gift was confirmed by an oath. In 1661, Adam, son of Gabriel Kełpiński, deeded his estates Shmankivtsi and Shmankivchyky, which remained after the death of his father Paweł Kełpiński, to Gabriel Silnitsky in Silnitsy, Lviv hunter and company commander.

On 26 July 1671, Ulrich von Werdum called the village Chernihiv; while here with a military convoy, he noted in his diary that "this village had a castle, which a few days ago, after a long defense, the Tatars stormed and killed all the people, not sparing women and children. The people of Verdum saw the bodies of the slain who had not yet been buried."

In 1672, Gabriel Silnicki, a castellan from Chernihiv, ceded his estates – the villages of Shmankivtsi and Shmankivchyky – to Stanisław Makowiecki, the Letychiv mayor, and his heirs.

In 1710, a tax on a quarter and a half of the smoke from the village of Shmankivtsi was levied on the maintenance of the garrison in the Okopa Holy Trinity Fortress. In 1724, the noble Józef Potocki donated his estate – part of the village of Shmankivtsi – to the monastery of the Chortkiv Dominicans.

Shmankivtsi's estate was also attacked by the nobility. In particular, the innkeeper cornet player Konstanty Lanckoroński, led by two hundred armed men, "maimed two priests and one brother; and Fr. Francis Pieszkowski tied to a horse, ran half a mile". Tomasz Makowiecki, a hunter from Lukiv, was no less cruel: his subjects beat the monks, tied them up, put them on a cart and took them out of the village. For these shameful actions, the men received sentences: Lanckoroński on 2 December 1740, and Tomasz Makowiecki on 17 December 1754. On 1 December 1755, the Uniate Metropolitan of Kyiv, Galicia, and All Rus Leo Szeptycki announced the excommunication (anathema) of them and their subjects who had taken part in the attacks.

In 1784, construction began on the wooden church of Cosmas and Damian, which was completed in 1785.

In 1785, 561 people lived in the village.

In the early 19th century, the Dominicans owned a farm with more than a hundred hectares of Shmankivtsi land. The farm was wooden. It had large rooms with two vanquiers, shingles, and a floor made of boards; it needed repair, as well as the nearby chapel.

Jan Ksawery Muszynski from Shmankivtsi married Karolina Kulchycka in 1842.

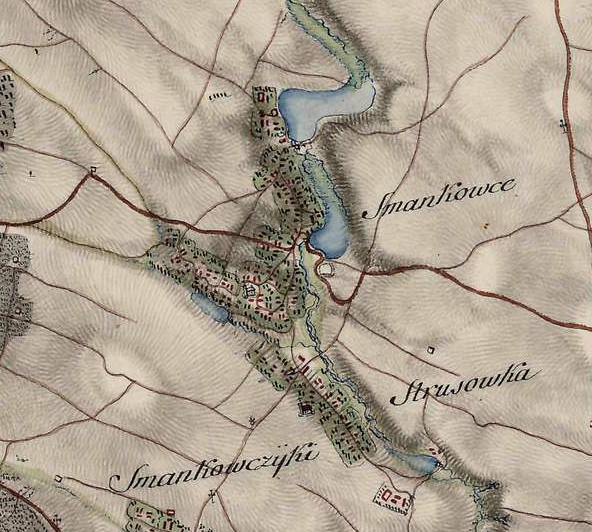
Shmankivtsi on the topographic map of Friedrich von Mig, late 18th century

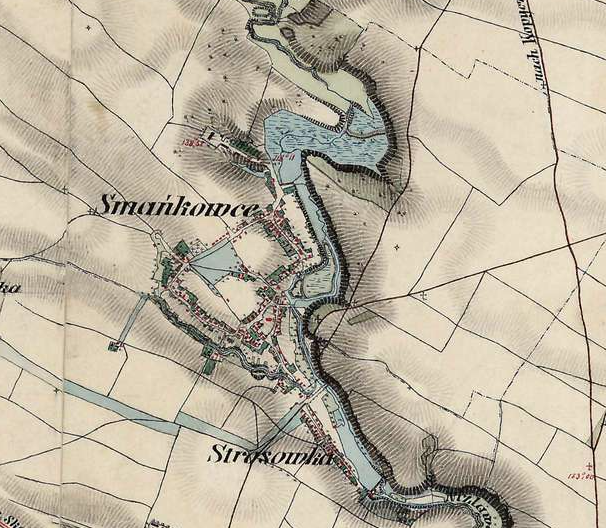
Shmankivtsi on the Austrian topographic map, 1861–1864.

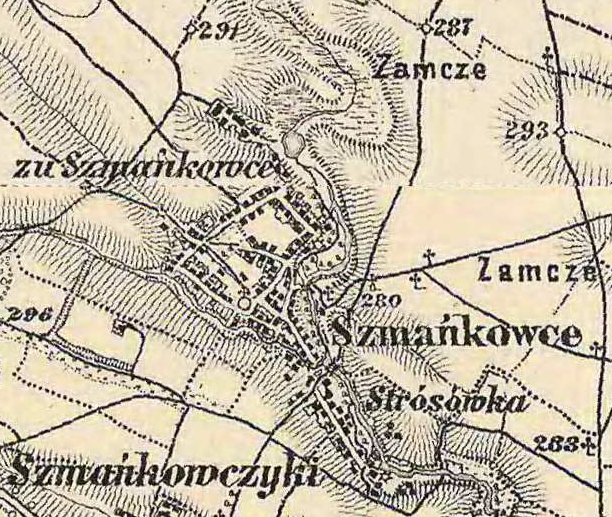
Shmankivtsi on the Austrian topographic map, 1869–1887.

=== 20th century ===
In 1900 there were 1229 inhabitants in Shmankivtsi, in 1910, 1201; in 1921, 1127; in 1931, 1112; in 1921, 255 households; in 1931, 235.

During the First World War, residents of the village Vasyl Solodkyi and Frants Shyderyk joined the Legion of Ukrainian Sich Riflemen; Antin Slota fought in the Ukrainian Galician Army.

In 2019, at the 40-meter height of the tower of the Chortkiv Church, archaeologist and researcher of fortifications and antiquities Volodymyr Dobrianskyi discovered a shrapnel shell detonator, and according to its flight trajectory determined that the 1st, 3rd, 4th and 7th cannon regiments (64 guns) under the command of Ataman Kyrylo Karas during the Chortkiv offensive (June 7–28, 1919) were stationed in the woods west of the village.

In 1927–1928, many residents of Shmankivtsi emigrated to Canada and other countries.

For some time Shmankivtsi was the center of the commune of the same name. From August 1, 1934 to 1939, the village belonged to the Kolyndiany Gmima.

After the Soviet annexation in September 1939, the Soviet authorities (NKVD authorities) arrested 26 villagers, including:

- Antin Baranovych,
- Myroslav Bodnaruk,
- Anton Boiko,
- Yevhenii Haliant,
- Luka Hermak,
- Petro Hermak,
- Ivan Hlukh,
- Osyp Hlukh,
- Anna Horiacha,
- Ivan Horiachyi,
- Mikhailo Horyachyi,
- Oleksii Horiachyi,
- Stanislava Horiacha,
- Teodor Davydiuk,
- Ivan Davydyuk,
- Ivan Krutsyk,
- Anton Sivak,
- Anton Slota,
- Olena Slota
- Mykola Stratii,
- Ostap Fedorovych,
- Oleksandr Tsebrovskyi,
- Vasyl Shalvytskyi.

During the Second World War there was a military airfield in Shmankivtsi.

From June 1941 to March 1944, the village was under Nazi occupation.

During the German–Soviet war, 67 residents of Shmankivtsi died or went missing in the Red Army, including:

- Petro Bilianinov (born 1923),
- Ivan Bodnar (born 1901),
- Petro Boiko (born 1899),
- Mikhailo Bryhadyr (born 1903)
- Mikhailo Bryhadyr (born 1915),
- Franko Vyshnevskyi (born 1915),
- Ivan Haliant (born 1913),
- Roman Haliant (born 1919),
- Yosyp Hermak (born 1912),
- Petro Hermak (born 1906),
- Stepan Hermak (born 1903),
- Anton Hermaniuk (born 1909),
- Mikhailo Hlukh (born 1919),
- Yevstahii Honta (born 1907),
- Hryhorii Humeniuk (born 1915),
- Vasyl Druk (born 1904),
- Mykola Zabiiaka (born 1907),
- Adam Zakharchuk (born 1926),
- Petro Ivanchiv (born 1912),
- Yosyp Ilmak (born 1915),
- Franko Ilmak (born 1924).

In 1954, a large-scale fire broke out on Strilka Street.

=== Period of Independence ===
On 26 May 1991, the first Chervona kalyna festivals and the unveiling of the statue to Stepan Charnetskyi took place.

In the night of 4–5 July 2000, a natural disaster struck the village, causing material damage to the villagers.

In 2005, Nadiia Morykvas published the book Melankholiia of Stepan Charnetskyi.

On 3 November 2013, residents of Strilka Street celebrated her day.

For two days, on 3–4 September 2016, in the fields of the village, a plane sprayed sunflower fields with pests from an agricultural company that leases shares from peasants from Shmankivtsi and neighboring villages. As a result, the vegetables burned, the fruit trees dropped their leaves, and several people were hospitalized with poisoning by an unknown substance.

In May 2019, 600 meters (2,000 ft) of the C201609 Shvaikivtsi-Zalissia district highway and a memorial to fellow villagers killed in the German-Soviet war were renovated in the village. On May 26, a festive prayer was held on the occasion of the 150th anniversary of the Chapel of St. Nicholas.

The first case of coronavirus disease was detected in the village on 7 October 2020. As of 27 July 2021, 55 cases were laboratory confirmed in Shmankivtsi, one of which was fatal.

From 27 November 2020, Shmankivtsi has been part of the Zavodske settlement hromada. On 12 November 2021, the Shmankivskyi Starostynskyi District was formed with its center in the village of Shmankivtsi.

== Religion ==
- Saints Cosmas and Damian church (1895; PCU; brick)
- Saints Cosmas and Damian church (2001; UGCC; brick),
- Saint Mary Magdalene church. Dominicans (1912, RCC, brick, restored 1986).

=== Chapels ===
- St. Nicholas (1869)
- worship chapel (1890, restored 2016)
- Mother of God (1990)
- on the occasion of the proclamation of Independence of Ukraine (1992)

=== John the Baptist church ===
In the 1730s, a small wooden church of John the Baptist was established by Sylvester Malskyi, with the church led by Father Matvii Molchanka. Between 1760 and 1775, the church was under jurisdiction of the Chortkiv Deanery of the Lviv Eparchy. The church is depicted on maps from the mid-18th century by Friedrich von Mieg, although is lost from the records by the 19th century.

== Monuments ==
- Oak of Shashkevych – a natural monument named after Markiian Shashkevych, grows near the bell tower of the Orthodox Church.
- Settlement Shmankivtsi I (Trypillia culture and ancient Russian times, 12th–13th centuries) – newly discovered objects of cultural heritage, protection number 1417.
- Settlement Shmankivtsi II (Trypillia and Chernyakhiv cultures) – newly discovered cultural heritage sites, protection number 1418.
- The settlement of Shmankivtsi III (castle site) is a newly discovered object of cultural heritage, protection number 2088.

Near the village is Lysenia Cave (length 34 m (112 ft), sandstone).

In 1943, a grave was built in honor of the Ukrainian Sich Riflemen, who died for the freedom of Ukraine (destroyed in 1946, restored in 1990).

Other monuments include:

- three commemorative crosses, including two in honor of the abolition of serfdom in 1848;
- a memorial cross to the victims of the typhus epidemic;
- Polish memorial crosses in praise of God (1903, 1932, 1940);
- wooden cross (1919, was dug into the ground near the Castle Hill);
- grave of an unknown soldier who died in battle near the village Zalissia (1944);
- bust of Ivan Franko (1990);
- bust of Taras Shevchenko (1990);
- statue of Stepan Charnetskyi (1991, sculptor Ivan Mulyarchuk, initiator of the installation Nadiia Protskiv);
- memorial to fellow villagers killed in the German-Soviet war (1992; restored 2019);
- monument to the people of Shmankivtsi who died on the battlefield and in the NKVD torture chambers (1994);
- memorial cross to three unknown soldiers (2013);
- monument to Roman Shukhevych (2013).

== Social sphere ==
From 1883 to 1909 there was an oil mill and two mills in Shmankivtsi, one of which was destroyed during the First World War. With the assistance of Fr. Ivan Hordievskyi the Enlightenment reading room was built, along with a savings bank and grocery store, and the Brotherhood of Sobriety was founded.

There were branches of the Ukrainian Prosvita Society, Sokol, Sich, Luh Society, agricultural society, Ridna Shkola and others, as well as consumer and credit cooperatives, kindergarten, theatrical and choral circles, and a library. The Polish societies Kółko rolnicze, Polish Związek Strzelecki and Dom Ludowy were active.

Until 2021, there was a house of culture and a library, which was reorganized into a studio of the Center for Cultural Services of the Factory Village Council.

Currently, the village has a school of I-II degrees, a studio of the Center for Cultural Services of the Factory Village Council, a first-aid post, and four trade establishments.

Shmankivtsi supports ancient traditions: every year on January 7 there is a nativity scene, and on January 14, Malanka.

=== Household ===
In 1940, a collective farm was forcibly organized, which resumed its work in 1948.

Among the agricultural enterprises were the Maiak agricultural share farm, Zlahoda private agricultural enterprise, Mriia-2000 private agricultural enterprise; today there is the Parostok private agricultural enterprise.

In the village also lives a farmer, Yurii Zakharchuk, who raises astrakhan sheep and cooks cheese.

== Famous people ==
- Olena Havrylko (1890–1967), Ukrainian artist, educator, public figure.
- Ilarion Hrabovych (1856—1903) – Ukrainian poet, literary figure, publicist, teacher.
- Stepan Charnetskyi (1881–1944) – Ukrainian poet, translator, journalist, theatre and music critic, and theatre director and producer, author of the anthem of the Ukrainian Sich Riflemen "Oi u luzi chervona kalyna".

== In literature ==
In 2008, schoolchildren wrote a song about Shmankivtsi.

== Sources ==
- (in Ukrainian) Гуцал П., Уніят В., Шманьківці // Ternopil Encyclopedic Dictionary: in 4 v. / editorial board: H. Yavorskyi and other, Ternopil: "Zbruch", 2008, V. 3: П—Я, S. 645. — ISBN 978-966-528-279-2.
- (in Ukrainian) Мельничук Б., Уніят В., Федечко М., Шманьківці // Ternopil Oblast. History of cities and villages: in 3 v. / Ternopil: "Terno-graph", 2014, V. 3: М—Ш, S. 521–522. — ISBN 978-966-457-246-7.
- (in Ukrainian) Шманьківці // Чортківська округа. Історично-мемуарний збірник / ред. колегія О. Соневицької та інші. — Париж — Сидней — Торонто : НТШ, Український архів, 1974. — Т. XXVII. — P. 181. : іл.
- Погорецький В. Чортківщина. Історико-туристичний путівник. — Тернопіль: Астон, 2007. — С. . : іл.
- Boniecki A. Herbarz polski: wiadomości historyczno-genealogiczne o rodach szlacheckich. — Warszawa : Warszawskie Towarzystwo Akcyjne S. Orgelbranda S[yn]ów), 1909. — Cz. 1. — T. 13. — S. 331–349. (пол.)
- "Szmańkowce". Geographical Dictionary of the Kingdom of Poland (in Polish). 12. Warszawa: Kasa im. Józefa Mianowskiego. 1892. p. 6.
- Добрянський В. Старожитності села Шманьківці на Чортківщині та питання локалізації «загадкового» замку «Czernichow»: ономастика, археологія, історія, геоприродне середовище та фортифікація // «Музейний простір: діалог історії та сучасності». Матеріали XIII наукової конференції. м. Бережани, 18 вересня 2025 р. — Бережани: Бережанський краєзнавчий музей, 2025. — С. 145—159.

== Links ==
External videos
- Вона була гімном українських січових стрільців та повстанців, а зараз звучить по всьому світу on YouTube // Суспільне Тернопіль. — 2022. — 25 квітня.

- Shmankivtsi on Facebook
- Shmankivtsi on Telegram
- Терлюк, І. Автор пісні «Ой у лузі червона калина» Степан Чарнецький — родом з Тернопільщини // Суспільне Новини. — 2022. — 18 квітня.
