= Saint Stanislaus Church in Chortkiv =

Church in Ternopil Oblast, Ukraine

Saint Stanislaus Church
- Костел святого Станіслава
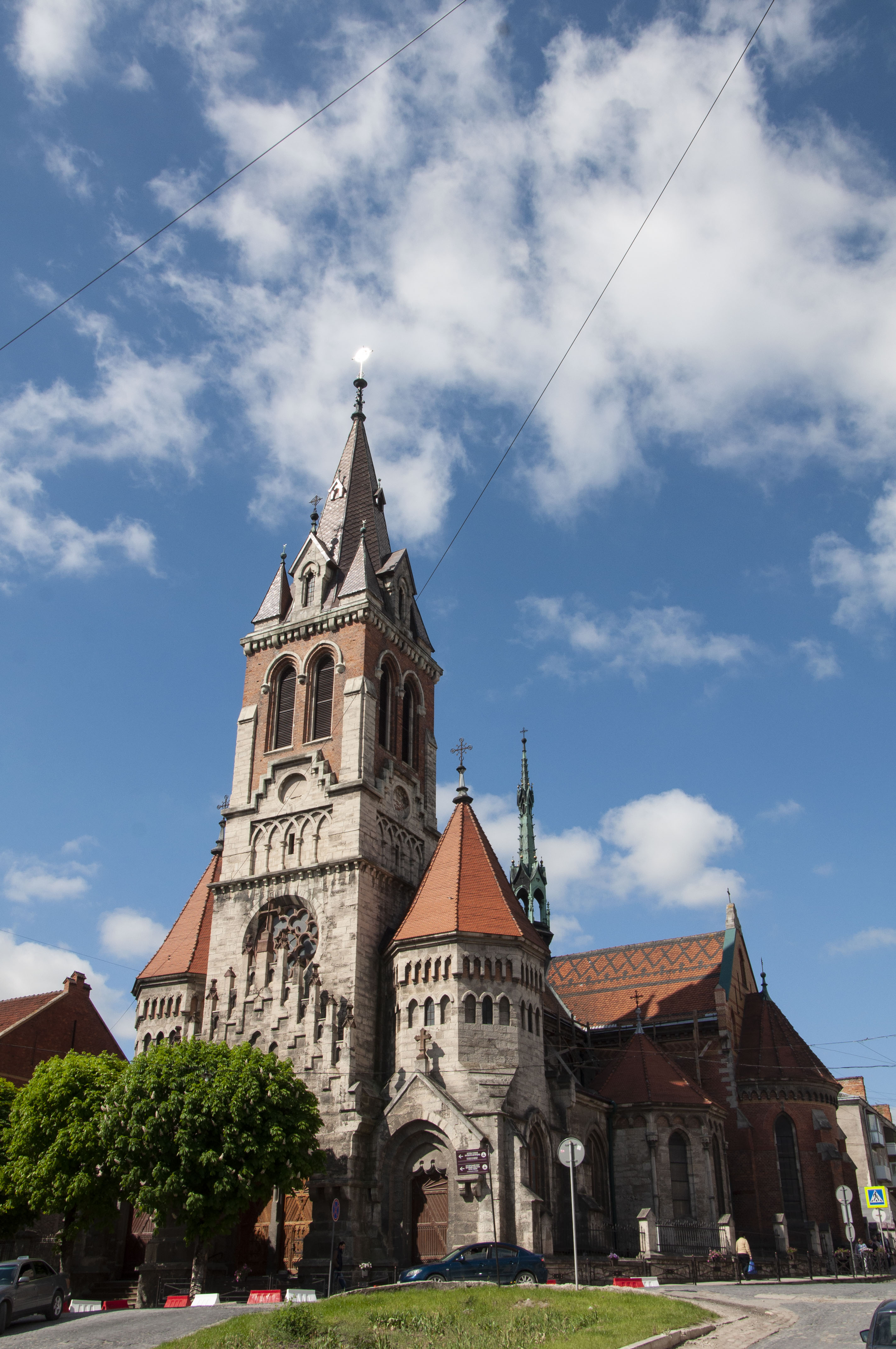

- Location within Ternopil Oblast

Religion
- Affiliation: Roman Catholic Church

Location
- Location: Chortkiv
- Interactive map of Saint Stanislaus Church
- Coordinates: 49°01′09″N 25°47′47″E

Saint Stanislaus Church (Ukrainian: Костел святого Станіслава) is a Roman Catholic Church in Chortkiv of the Chortkiv urban hromada of the Chortkiv Raion of the Ternopil Oblast.

== History ==
On February 22, 1610, the Rus' voivode and owner of the town Stanisław Golski invited the Dominican Fathers to Chortkiv and founded a church and monastery for them. The first church was built together with the monastery in 1619. After his death, the founder was buried in the crypt of the church. The temple was visited by Polish kings, including Jan II Casimir (in 1663) or Jan III Sobieski (in 1673).

The church of the 18th century turned out to be too small for parishioners, so at the turn of the 19th/20th century it was decided to build a new (current) church in its place (after dismantling the old one). Construction was completed in 1918. It is constructed by Polish architect Jan Sas Zubrzycki in the Vistulan Gothic style. The authors of the figures of saints were Czeslaw Stowp and Damian Stankiewicz.

In 1941, Soviet troops, fleeing to the east, set fire to the church and monastery, destroying the building.

After the end of World War II and the departure of Poles from the local lands, the Soviet authorities closed the church and set up a fertilizer warehouse, and valuable Dresden organs inside were destroyed (later the Dresden authorities wanted to buy them back, but it was too late). The church was handed over to the Dominican Fathers in a ruined state in 1989. The first pastor (after the Second World War) was Father Reginald Vyshnevskyi from Chortkiv.

Until the end of the Second World War, the church kept a Madonna and Child of Chortkiv, presented to the Dominicans in the 17th century by King Jan Casimir. It was saved from destruction by former Polish parishioners, who were forcibly moved to the new borders of Poland, and in the 1980s placed it in the church of St. Hyacinth in Warsaw, where he remains to this day. A crowned copy of the icon is kept in the church in Chortkiv.

In 2019, at the 40-meter height of the tower of the Saint Stanislaus church in Chortkiv, archeologist, researcher of fortifications and antiquities Volodymyr Dobrianskyi discovered a shrapnel shell detonator, and based on its flight path, he determined that the 1st, 3rd, 4th, and 7th gun regiments (64 guns) under the command of Ataman Kyrylo Karas were located in the forest west of Shmankivtsi, Chortkiv Raion, during the Chortkiv offensive (7-28 June 1919).

== See also ==
- Chortkiv Castle (old)
