= Uhryn, Ukraine =

Uhryn Угринь
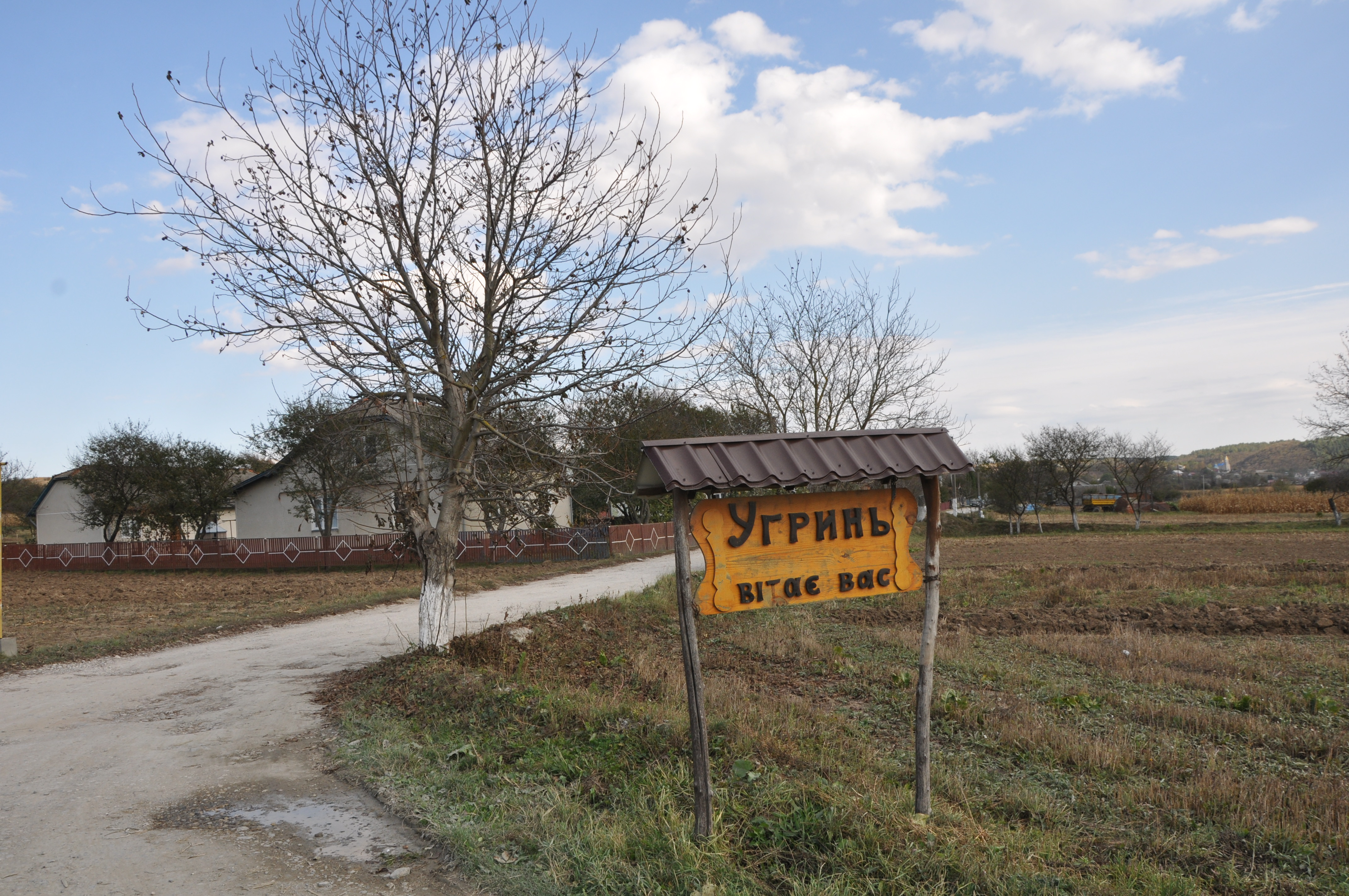

- Location in Ternopil Oblast
- Coordinates: 48°58′13″N 25°50′25″E
- Country: Ukraine
- Oblast: Ternopil Oblast
- Raion: Chortkiv Raion
- Hromada: Zavodske Hromada

Population (2021)
  - Total: 831
- Time zone: UTC+2 (EET)
  - Summer (DST): UTC+3 (EEST)
- Postal code: 48550

Uhryn (Ukrainian: Угринь, Polish: Uhryń) is a village in Ukraine, Ternopil Oblast, Chortkiv Raion, Zavodske settlement hromada.

The village has a karst cave called Uhryn.

== History ==
The first written mention dates from 1427.

Since 11 August 2015, Uhryn has belonged to the Zavodske settlement hromada.

== Religion ==
- Church of the Dormition (1870, OCU)
