= Melankholiia of Stepan Charnetskyi =

Book by Nadiia Morykvas

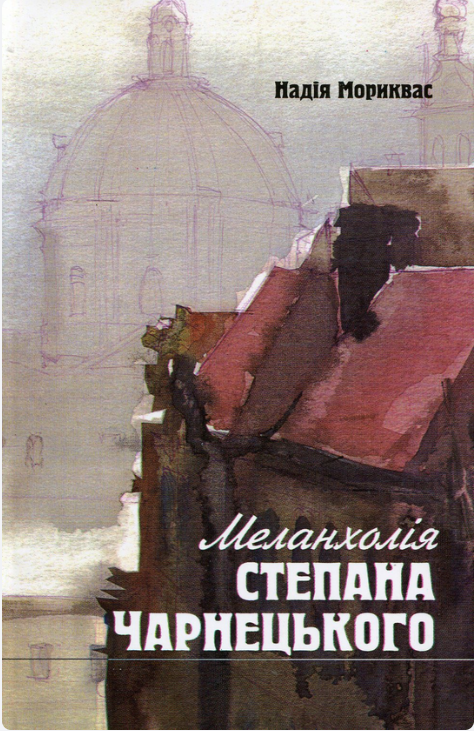
Cover of Nadiia Morykvas's book "Melankholiia of Stepan Charnetskyi"

Melankholiia of Stepan Charnetskyi (Ukrainian: Меланхолія Степана Чарнецького) is a book published in 2005 by Nadiia Morykvas about the life and work of Ukrainian poet Stepan Charnetskyi, one of the probable authors of the Ukrainian National Anthem "Oi u luzi chervona kalyna".

== Synopsis ==
The book is written in the style of a fictionalized biography. It tells the story of the difficult fate of one of the members of the Lviv literary group "Moloda Muza", the poet Stepan Charnetskyi, who is also the author of short stories and feuilletons, a theater and music critic, and the author of the essay "History of Ukrainian Theater in Galicia".

The writer actualizes the issue of the artist's involvement in the Riflemen's cohort, explores the history of the song "Chervona kalyna", supplements the poet's life story with various details, and also uses archival materials, memoirs of the poet's contemporaries, in particular his daughter Oleksandra Kuchma-Charnetska.

== Reviews ==
Valerii Shevchuk, Laureate of the Taras Shevchenko National Prize of Ukraine, was most attracted to the book by the fact that the author showed a deep interest in the Galician "Molodomuzivtsi" who created the phenomenon of early modernism not only in poetry but also in prose.

And PhD in Philology Sofiia Kohut noted that the tradition of the essay is still very weakly rooted in Ukrainian culture, and we probably do not have a tradition of the biographical essay at all. She calls Nadiia Morykvas's work somewhat innovative (although such an aggressive word is not appropriate for her intimate, sophisticated fiction).

Candidate of Philology Iryna Rozdolska emphasizes that Ms. Nadiia made a valuable contribution to the field of Charnetskyi's biography and interpretation of his literary silhouette, represented by the writer's studies: the scientific essay "Melankholiia of Stepan Charnetskyi" and her PhD thesis. Also, philologist Iryna Rozdolska emphasizes how the researcher actualizes the issue of the artist's involvement in the war, the riflemen's cohort, and adds various details to his biography, but leaves the main question of "whether he was at war, when, under what circumstances," etc. open, motivating it by the life and artistic stance of S. Charnetskyi himself. Charnetskyi himself, seeing in his literary heritage an affirmative answer based on the presence of the war theme in his lyrics as the author's existential reaction to geopolitical events.

== Awards ==
In 2006, Nadiia Morykvas was awarded the Bohdan Lepkyi Lviv Regional Prize in the prose category for her book Melankholiia of Stepan Charnetskyi.
