= Saints Cosmas and Damian Church, Shmankivtsi (Orthodox Church of Ukraine) =

Ukrainian Orthodox church in Shmankivtsi, Ukraine

Saints Cosmas and Damian church
- Церква святих безсрібників Косми і Даміана
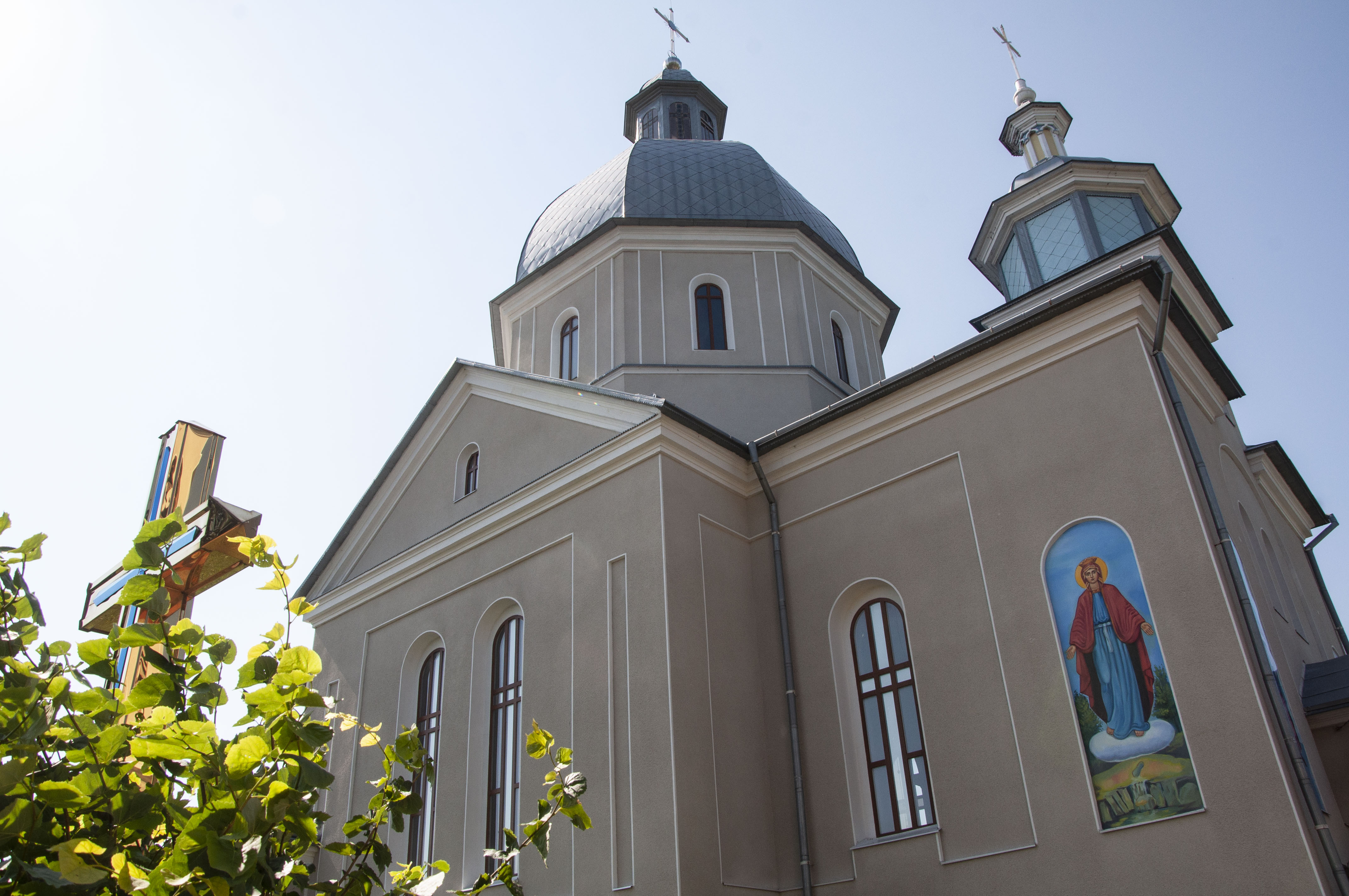

- Location within Ternopil Oblast

Religion
- Affiliation: Orthodox Church of Ukraine

Location
- Location: Shmankivtsi
- Coordinates: 48°59′29″N 25°55′14″E

Architecture
- Architect: Yosyp Stets

Saints Cosmas and Damian Church (Ukrainian: Церква святих безсрібників Косми і Даміана) is an orthodox parish church (OCU) in Shmankivtsi, Zavodske settlement hromada, Chortkiv Raion, Ternopil Oblast.

== History ==
In 1885, a new stone Greek Catholic church was built and consecrated on the site of a wooden church, by the parishioners of the villages of Shmankivtsi and Shmankivchyky. Architect — Yosyp Stets.

In 1869 the parishioners of the village and Mykola Karpinskyi (founder) built the chapel of St. Nicholas, which was first renewed in 1926. In Soviet times, the figure of St. Nicholas was moved to the churchyard. In 1989, the chapel was restored.

In May–September 1939, through the efforts of Fr. Porfyrii Hordievskyi painted in memory of the 950th anniversary of the baptism of Rus'-Ukraine (artist M. Chuiko).

In 1959, on the occasion of the 25th anniversary of his priesthood, the church was reconstructed with the donations of parishioners and the efforts of Pastor Mykola Stetsyk (artists Marko Nykolyshyn, Zinovii Tymoshyk, plasterer Ivan Babii).

In 2020, a cross was found in the bell tower building, which once served as a wooden temple.

There is a fraternity, a sisterhood, a church committee and a church choir.

Near the church grows a botanical natural monument of local significance "Oak Shashkevych".

== Abbots ==
- at. Havryil Romanovych (1732–1733)
- at. Semen Studynskyi (1831)
- at. Yurii Syroichkovskyi (1831–1838)
- at. Mikhailo Hrabovych (1838–1867)
- at. Mykola Charnetskyi (1867–1882)
- at. Ivan Mohylnytskyi (1882–1883)
- at. Ivan Hordievskyi (1883–1909)
- at. Porfyrii Hordievskyi (1909–1938)
- at. Volodymyr Kharuk (1937–1938)
- at. Yosyp Dribniuk (1938–1945)
- at. Mykola Stetsyk (1945–1980)
- at. Ivan Hnidec (1980–2001)
- at. Volodymyr Lyzhechko of February 13, 2001.

== See also ==
- Saints Cosmas and Damian church, Shmankivtsi (Greek Catholic)

== Sources ==
- с. Шманьківці. Храм св. вмч. і безсрр Косми і Даміана // Храми Української Православної Церкви Київського патріархату. Тернопільщина / Автор концепції Куневич Б.; головний редактор Буяк Я.; фото: Снітовський О., Крочак І., Кислинський Е., Бурдяк В. — Тернопіль : ТОВ «Новий колір», 2012. — С. 383. : іл. — ISBN 978-966-2061-24-6.
- (in English) Smankivci // Історичний шематизм Львівської архієпархії (1832—1944) : у 2 т. / Дмитро Блажейовський. — Київ : КМ Академія, 2004. — Т. 1 : Адміністрація і парохії. — P. 744–745. — ISBN 966-518-225-0.
- (in English) Smankivci // Dmytro Blazheyovskyi. Historical sematism of the Eparchy of Stanyslaviv: From its establishment until the outbreak of World War II (1885–1938). — Записки ЧСВВ, Секція I. — Т. 51. Lviv: Misioner, 2002. — P. 212. — ISBN 966-658-028-4.
