= Young Muse =

Early 20th-century group of modernist Ukrainian writers in Galicia

Young Muse (Ukrainian: Молода муза, romanized: Moloda muza) was a group of modernist Ukrainian writers based in Galicia, primarily the city of Lviv, who were active from 1906 to 1909 or 1914. Inspired by the Young Poland movement and Western European modernist writers, Young Muse placed value on aesthetics over utilitarianism and focus on national or ideological themes. Leading members of the group included Volodymyr Birchak, Petro Karmanskyi, Bohdan Lepky, Ostap Lutskyi, Vasyl Pachovskyi, and Sydir Tverdokhlib, among others.

In contrast to Young Poland, Young Muse was strongly opposed by the intelligentsia of Austro-Hungarian western Ukraine, most notably Serhiy Yefremov and Denys Lukiianovych. Facing a lack of public support, the Svit magazine, which published Young Muse' works, abandoned them after nine months of publication. In Russian-ruled eastern Ukraine, however, Young Muse' activities were celebrated, and a group led by Mykola Yevshan and Mykyta Shapoval supported them. Ukrainian House, a magazine inspired by Young Muse, began publication in Russian Ukraine in 1909. Ivan Franko, a western Ukrainian cultural leader, was appreciative of the quality of the group's work, but felt that they were insufficiently attentive to the development of the Ukrainian national identity, and criticised them as decadent for their devotion to imagery.

In addition to its primary members, Young Muse included two painters (Ivan Kosynin and Ivan Severyn), a sculptor (Mykhailo Parashchuk), a composer (Stanyslav Lyudkevych), and a politician (Mykhailo Petrytskyi), among others.

Although they sought to distance themselves from politics, politics influenced the fate of many of Young Muse, who were either forced to adhere to socialist realism (in the case of Karmanskyi) or died in the Gulag (in the case of Birchak and Lutskyi).

Young Muse have been compared to the Pre-Raphaelite Brotherhood by Vasyl Stefanyk Precarpathian National University professor S. I. Nisevych, who in particular notes the groups' shared opposition to industrial society and focus on aesthetics. Ukrainian poet and literary historian Viktor Neborak has also compared them to the existentialist movement, although it would not come to Ukraine until far after Young Muse had already disappeared.
