= Stanisław Golski =

Polish nobleman

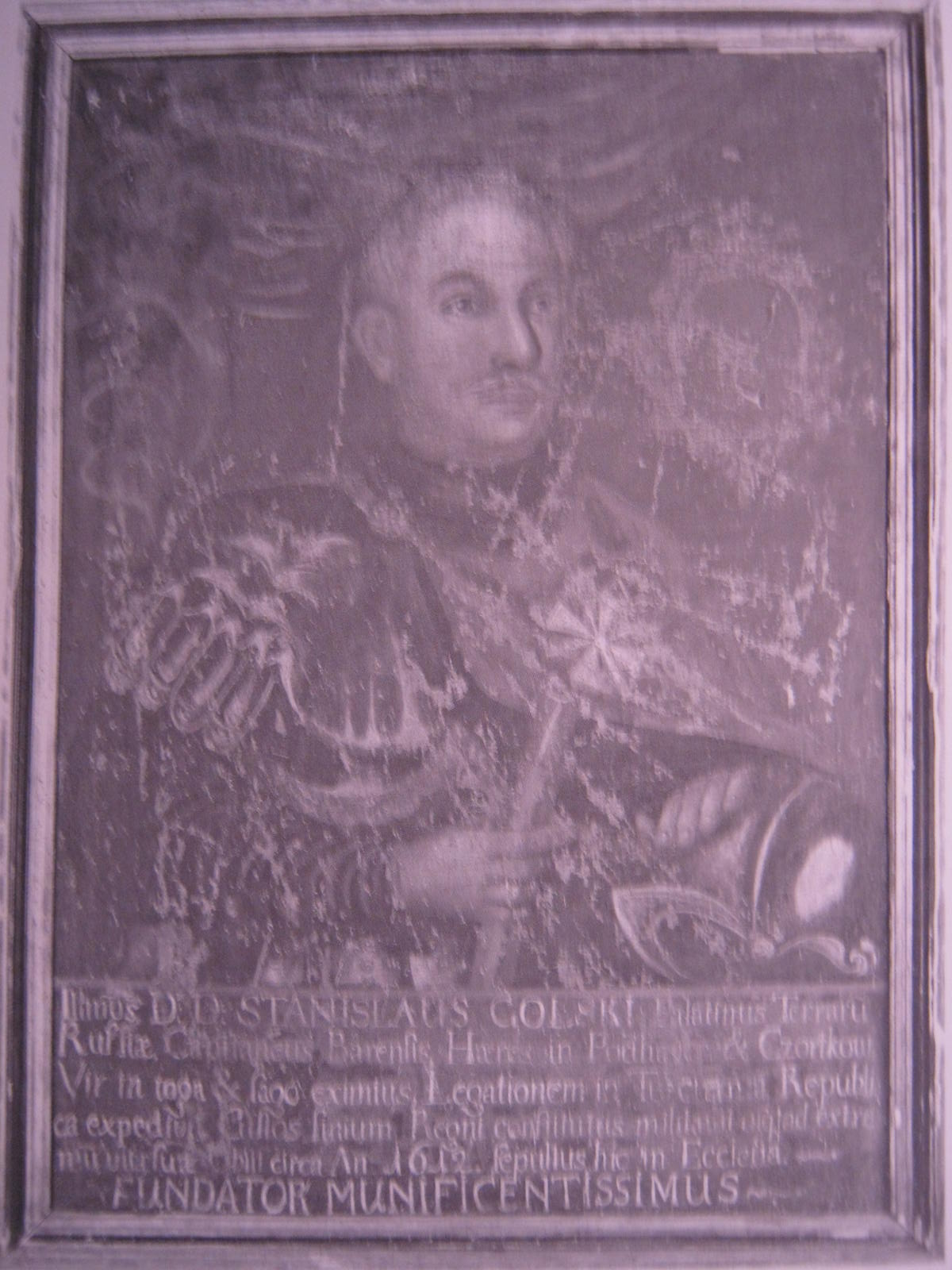
Stanisław Golski

Rola coat of arms

Stanisław Golski (Gulski) of the Rola coat of arms (died 1612) was a Ruthenian Voivode from 1603, Podolia from 1599, Castellan of Halych from 1594, Starosta of Bar and Letychiv, diplomatic representative of the Polish–Lithuanian Commonwealth in the Ottoman Empire in 1597.

== Biography ==
He was a royal rittmaster. He took part in the Livonian campaign of Stephen Báthory. Together with the kwarciane army, he defended the southeastern borderlands of the Polish–Lithuanian Commonwealth against the Tatars.

In 1611, Jerzy Wojciech Buczacki-Tworowski sold him the villages of Góra, Żyznowiec, Trybuchowce, Mezańce, Soroka, and Pilatówka. Stanisław Golski was the owner of, among others, Buczacz, Podhajce, and Czortków.

On 13–14 August 2016, the "Golskyi FEST" festival will take place in Chortkiv.

== Bibliography ==
- Kazimierz Lepszy: Golski (Gulski) Stanisław. W: Polski Słownik Biograficzny. T. VIII. 1959–1960, s. 230–231.
- Władysław Łoziński: Prawem i lewem. Obyczaje na Czerwonej Rusi w pierwszej połowie XVII wieku. T. 2. Lwów : nakładem księgarni H. Altenberga, 1904.
