= Dmytro Blazheyovskyi =

Ukrainian clergyman (1910–2011)

- Native name: Дмитро Блажейовський
- Church: Ukrainian Greek Catholic Church

Orders
- Ordination: 2 April 1939

Personal details
- Born: 21 August 1910 Wisłok Górny, Lemko Region (now Poland)
- Died: 23 April 2011 (aged 100) Lviv, Ukraine
- Buried: Yaniv Cemetery, Lviv
- Education: Pontifical Urban University; Pontifical Gregorian University

Dmytro Blazheyovskyi (Ukrainian: Дмитро Блажейовський, Polish: Dmytro Błażejowski; 21 August 1910 – 23 April 2011) was a Ukrainian Catholic priest and writer. Blazheyovskyi authored over twenty-five scholarly articles on the history of the Ukrainian church. He died in Lviv, aged 100.

Blazheyovskyi was well known in Ukraine for his numerous sketches of traditional Ukrainian embroidery. Throughout his life, Blazheyovskyi had exhibitions of his work in his home country and abroad. On 6 May 1999, he opened a museum in Lviv. He was awarded with the Shevchenko National Prize.

== Biography ==
Blazheyovskyi was born in 1910 in Wisłok Górny in the Lemko Region. He studied in the Gymnasium in Przemyśl (1922-1930). He studied Philosophy, Theology, and History in 1933-1946 at Catholic universities in Italy, completed two doctoral studies (in Theology (1942) – Pontifical Urban University; in History (1946) – Pontifical Gregorian University). He was ordained on 2 April 1939 in Rome.

After, he worked as a priest among the Ukrainian diaspora in the United States of America – Ansonia, Connecticut (1946–47), St. Joseph, Missouri (1947-55), Omaha and Lincoln, Nebraska, Denver, Colorado; and organized parishes in those cities in 1950-1955; Denver (1955–58), Philadelphia, Pennsylvania (1958–59), Houston, Texas (1959-73).

After 1973, he published twenty-five scientific, ten articles in History of the Church, and Ukrainian Religious Embroiders, fourteen albums of embroidered designs. Following the declaration of Independence of Ukraine, Blazheyovskyi began to bring exhibitions of his icons and gonfalons.

== Later years and death ==
From 1992-2010, Blazheyovskyi held 170 exhibitions of embroidered icons in Ukraine and 55 exhibitions outside Ukraine. On 6 May 1999, he opened his museum of embroidered icons in Lviv. Until 2010 he lived in Rome, where he celebrated his 100th anniversary and the 70th anniversary of priest work. He solemnly celebrated his 100th anniversary in Lviv; the celebration was held on 20 August 2010 at the Maria Zankovetska Theatre. He died on Easter Saturday, 23 April 2011, at the age of 101. Blazheyovskyi is buried at Yaniv Cemetery, Lviv.

== Publications ==
- Власть Київських Митрополитів над монахами (1596—1809). — Рим (Rome), 1973
- Українська і вірменська папські семінарії у Львові (1665—1784). — Рим, 1975
- Митрополії, епархії і екзархати візантійсько-київського обряду. Номенклатура і статистика. — Рим, 1980
- Студенти візантійсько-київського обряду в папських колегіях і семінаріях, університетах та інститутах Центральної і Західної Европи. — Рим, 1984
- Шематизм Української Католицької Церкви у діаспорі. — Рим, 1988
- Українське католицьке духовенство у діаспорі (1751—1988). — Рим, 1988
- Ієрархія Київської Церкви (861—1990). — Рим, 1990
- Українська Папська Мала Семінарія св. Йосафата у Римі (1951—1990). — Рим, 1990
- Берестейська Ре-Унія та українська історична доля i недоля. — Львів (Lviv), 1995
- Історичний шематизм Перемиської Епархії з включенням Апостольської Адміністратури Лемківщини (1828—1939). — Львів, 1995, ISBN 5-7745-0672-X
- Альбом вишиваних ікон та образів. — Львів, 1999
- Мої рефлексії щодо проблем минулого, теперішнього і будущності українського народу. — Львів, 2010

== Awards ==
- Order of Merit 3d class (2006)
