= Zavodske settlement hromada =

Hromada in Ternopil Oblast, Ukraine

Zavodske settlement hromada Заводська селищна громада
- hromada
- Location within Ternopil Oblast Location within Ukraine
- Coordinates: 48°59′47″N 25°51′32″E
- Country: Ukraine
- Oblast: Ternopil Oblast
- Raion: Chortkiv Raion
- Administrative center: Zavodske

Government
  - Hromada head: Liudmyla Pavlinska

Area
  - Total: 91.1 km^{2} (35.2 sq mi)

Population (2022)
  - Total: 6,758
- Urban-type settlement: 1
- Villages: 5
- Website: zavodska-gromada.gov.ua

Zavodske settlement hromada (Ukrainian: Заводська селищна територіальна громада, romanized: Zavodska selyshchna terytorialna hromada) is a hromada in Ukraine, in Chortkiv Raion of Ternopil Oblast. The administrative center is the urban-type settlement of Zavodske. Its population is 6,758 (2022 estimate)

== History ==
It was formed on 11 August 2015 by merging Zavodske Village Council and Uhryn Village Council of Chortkiv Raion.

On 27 November 2020, Zalisianska, Shvaikivska, Shmankivska and Shmankivchytska village councils of Chortkiv Raion became part of the community.

== Settlements ==
The community consists of 1 urban-type settlement (Zavodske) and 5 villages:

- Zalissia
- Uhryn
- Shvaikivtsi
- Shmankivtsi
- Shmankivchyky
