= Saint Nicholas Church in Chortkiv =

Lost church in Ternopil Oblast, Ukraine

Saint Nicholas Church
- Церква святого Миколая Чудотворця
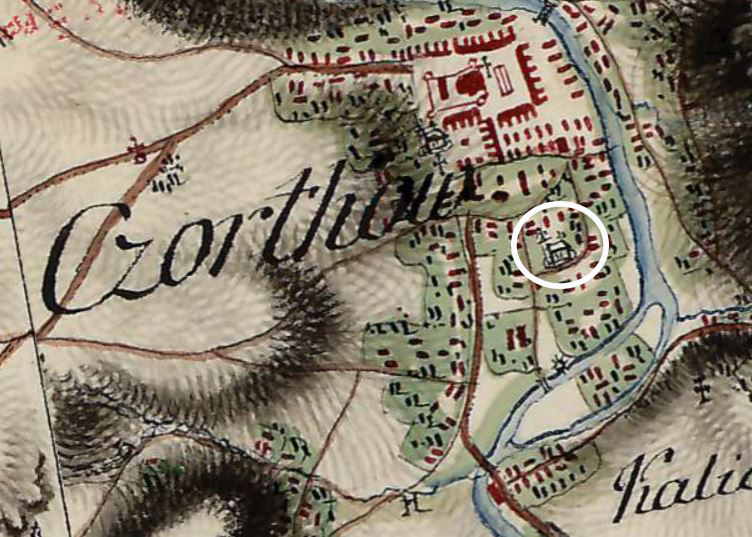
- Church on the map by Friedrich von Mieg (1782)

- Location within Ternopil Oblast

Religion
- Affiliation: Ukrainian Greek Catholic Church

Location
- Location: Chortkiv, Chortkiv urban hromada, Chortkiv Raion, Ternopil Oblast, Ukraine
- Coordinates: 49°00′51″N 25°47′57″E

Architecture
- Completed: 1714

Saint Nicholas Church (Ukrainian: Церква святого Миколая Чудотворця) was a parish Greek Catholic parish church (UGCC) in Chortkiv, Ternopil Oblast, that existed from 1714 to 1801 in the central part of the city. It was the oldest and first church in Chortkiv, located in Old Chortkiv.

== History ==
Joachim Potocki donated land for the construction of the church.

In 1714 the church was built and consecrated. The rite of consecration was performed by the dean of Chortkiv, at. Vasyl Tverdyievych; in 1715 a Lenten triodion was purchased for the church; in 1721 a church brotherhood was established; in 1768 Joachim Potocki's wife Eva from Kanevski legalized the ownership of church lands; in 1801 the church burned down. The cause of the fire is unknown. The parish was joined to the parish of the Church of the Dormition.

The church was made of hewn bone, surrounded by a circle of shingles, covered with shingles, and had an oak floor. The bell tower next to it was made of six pillars, knitted into two chairs, shingled, and covered. There was a cemetery near the church until the Austrian authorities ordered the city governments to move them outside the settlements.

It often burned down, so no documents from the 15th–16th centuries have survived.

== Priests ==
- at. Theodor Karchokovskyi
- at. Ivan Zarytskyi
- at. Andrii Lipnytskyi
