= Stepan Usyk =

Ukrainian painter (1925–2001)

- Степан Григорович Усик
- Born: June 16, 1925; Studenyky, Kyiv Oblast, Ukraine
- Died: September 11, 2001; Uzhhorod, Ukraine
- Education: Kyiv Higher School of Applied Arts, Kyiv Pechersk Lavra, Kyiv Art School
- Known for: Painting
- Notable work: Kobzar, Bread and Salt, Portrait of Father, Carpathian Winter, Fir House

Stepan Usyk (June 16 1925 – September 11 2001) was a Ukrainian painter and member of the Transcarpathian painting school.

== Early life and education ==
Usyk was born on June 16, 1925, in Studenyky, Kyiv Oblast, Ukraine. He studied at the Kyiv Higher School of Applied Arts and the Kyiv Pechersk Lavra, later receiving his art education at the Kyiv Art School.

During World War II, Usyk was sent to Nazi Germany to perform forced labour. He was later imprisoned by the Soviet Union in 1954 for 5 years for "anti-Soviet agitation and Ukrainian bourgeois nationalism". After his release, he graduated from the painting department of the Uzhhorod School of Applied Arts, where he defended his diploma work Shevchenko-Kobzar.

Usky died on September 11, 2001, in Uzhhorod.

== Painting career ==
Usyk's works are focused on Ukraine, Carpathian landscapes, wooden churches, still lifes, and portraits. He painted the Church of the Intercession in Kostryno. He participated in the reconstruction of the Kyiv Pechersk Lavra and in the restoration of the St. Sophia Cathedral of Kyiv, restoring 15 kilograms (33 lb) of gold leaf on the cathedral dome.

Transcarpathian painters Yosyp Bokshay and Stepan Sigetiy had an important influence on Usyk's works.

His paintings are displayed museums and private collections in Ukraine, France, Germany, Hungary, Italy, the United States of America, and other countries.
