= Church of the Immaculate Conception of the Blessed Virgin Mary in Chortkiv =

Church in Ternopil Oblast, Ukraine

Church of the Immaculate Conception of the Blessed Virgin Mary
- Ukrainian: Церква Непорочного Зачаття Пречистої Діви Марії
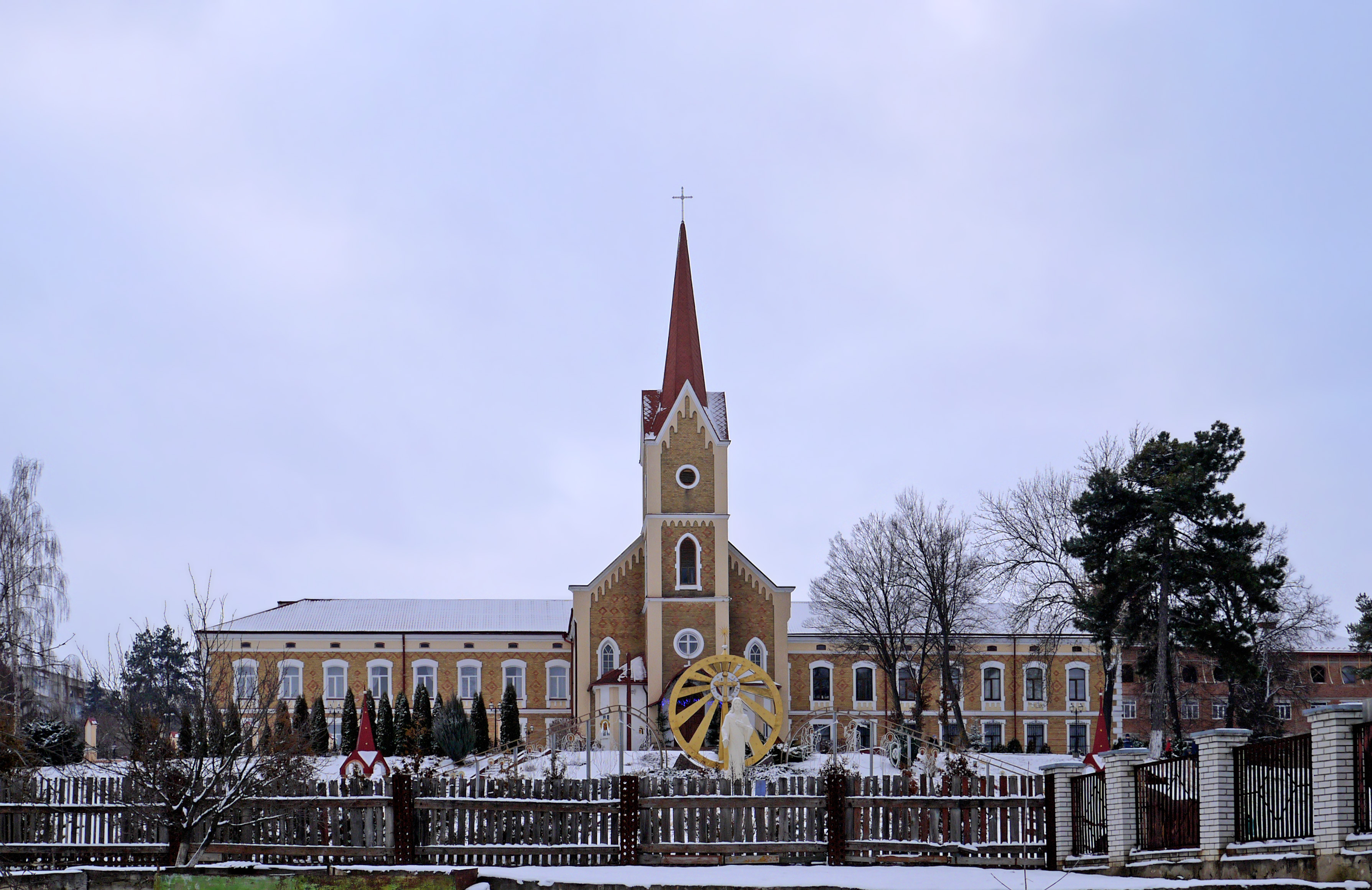
- Church of the Immaculate Conception of the Blessed Virgin Mary
- 49°00′54″N 25°47′07″E
- Location: Chortkiv, Chortkiv urban hromada, Chortkiv Raion, Ternopil Oblast
- Country: Ukraine
- Denomination: Ukrainian Greek Catholic

History
- Status: Convent (1854–1944); Profane use (1944–1993); Church (since 1993)

Architecture
- Functional status: Active
- Completed: 1854 (as a convent)

The Church of the Immaculate Conception of the Blessed Virgin Mary (Ukrainian: Церква Непорочного Зачаття Пречистої Діви Марії) is a Greek Catholic parish church in Chortkiv of the Chortkiv urban hromada in the Chortkiv Raion of the Ternopil Oblast, in Ukraine.

== History ==
The church is located in the former church of the Sisters of Mercy convent. The church and the convent were built in 1854 with money from the last owner of Chortkiv, Heronim Sadovskyi. The nunnery operated until 1944, after which it became an NKVD prison. Now the basement is home to a museum of Bolshevik terror, political prisoners, and the repressed.

In 1993, a parish was formed. In August of the same year, the Greek Catholic community received the keys to the monastery premises.

The parish has the following organizations: the Pope's Worldwide Prayer Network, the Housekeeping Brotherhood, the Mothers in Prayer community, the St. Joseph's Men's Community, the Faith, Hope, Love and Mother Sophia community, the Face of the Lord, and a Bible study group.

== Priests ==
- at. Hryhorii Kanak (administrator, since 30 November 1993; priest, since 23 May 2000)
