= Volodymyr Zabolotnyi =

Volodymyr Zabolotnyi may refer to:

- Volodymyr Zabolotnyi (architect) (1898–1962), Soviet and Ukrainian architect, founder of the Academy of Architecture of Ukraine and designer of the Verkhovna Rada building, Government Palace (Kharkiv)
- Volodymyr Zabolotnyi (priest) (born 1960), Ukrainian actor, public and religious figure
