= Church of the Holy Trinity in Chortkiv =

Lost church in Ternopil Oblast, Ukraine

Church of the Holy Trinity Церква святої Тройці
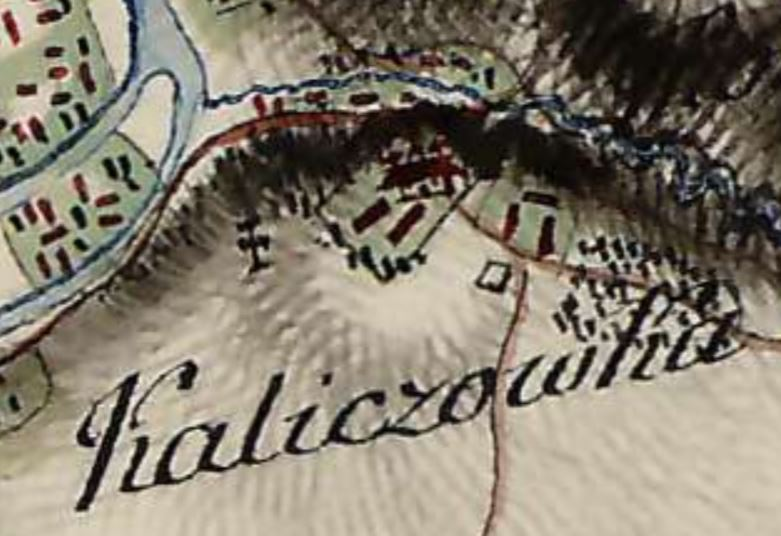
- Church on the map by Friedrich von Mieg (1782)

- Location within Ternopil Oblast

Religion
- Affiliation: Ukrainian Greek Catholic Church

Location
- Location: Chortkiv, Chortkiv urban hromada, Chortkiv Raion, Ternopil Oblast, Ukraine
- Coordinates: 49°00′42″N 25°48′24″E

Architecture
- Completed: 1607

Church of the Holy Trinity (Ukrainian: Церква святої Тройці) was a Greek Catholic parish church (UGCC) in Chortkiv of the Ternopil Oblast.

== History ==
In 1607, a captain in the Polish army, Mykhailo Yakiv, founded the Basil of Caesarea Monastery and the Church of the Holy Trinity on Mount Yurchynskykh.

The monastery church was brick, single-domed, and cruciform. The church had two doors – the main western and the side southern ones.

The condition of the church was not very good, and the monks thought about building a new brick church. The project was commissioned by the grandfather of Chortkiv, Joachim Potocki, and approved by Athanasius Szeptycki. But it was never realized.
