= Basil of Caesarea Monastery in Chortkiv =

Lost monastery in Ternopil Oblast, Ukraine

Basil of Caesarea Monastery Монастир Василія Великого
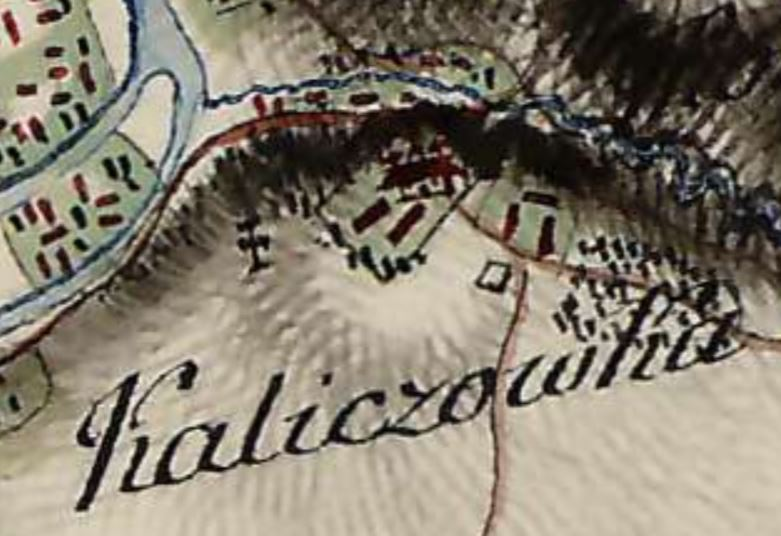
- The Church of the Holy Trinity and the monastery of the Basilians on von Mieg's map of 1780.

- Location within Ternopil Oblast

Religion
- Affiliation: Ukrainian Greek Catholic Church

Location
- Location: Chortkiv, Chortkiv urban hromada, Chortkiv Raion, Ternopil Oblast, Ukraine
- Interactive map of Basil of Caesarea Monastery; Монастир Василія Великого
- Coordinates: 49°00′42″N 25°48′24″E

Architecture
- Completed: 1607

Basil of Caesarea Monastery (Ukrainian: Монастир Василія Великого) was a Greek Catholic monastery (UGCC) in Chortkiv of the Ternopil Oblast, that existed from 1607 to 1792 in the Kalichivka area.

== History ==
In 1607, a captain in the Polish army, Mykhailo Yakiv, founded the St. Basil's Monastery and the Church of the Holy Trinity on Mount Yurchynskykh. The monastery was to be supported by 12 neighboring parishes.

In 1676, the Turks burned the monastery. The faithful quickly restored the shrine at the end of the seventeenth century.

On 20 February 1722, the owner of the city granted a privilege to the monastery of St. Basil. He granted it a field for perpetual ownership.

In 1724 the monastery was not independent but belonged to the abbot of Krasnopushcha. There were four monks.

On 12 January 1782, Kaiser Joseph II issued a decree on the liquidation of monasteries and convents. The monastery was liquidated by its last abbot, at. Onufrii Kryzhanovskyi.

On 28 March 1792, the liquidation (sale) of the movable estate of the Chortkiv monastery took place.

In 1792 the monastery of St. Basil was demolished.

In 1802 the monastery land was sold to Joseph Mroczynski for 4,920 florins.

In 1912, three stone crosses were erected on the site of the monastery to replace the wooden crosses that were erected in 1792.

== Priests ==
- at. Anastasii Kornytskyi
- at. Yozef Brylynskyi
- at. Lonhin Vasylevych
- at. Onufrii Kryzhanovskyi
- at. Vasyl Rabii and others
