= Chortkiv =

City in Ternopil Oblast, Ukraine

Chortkiv Чортків
- City
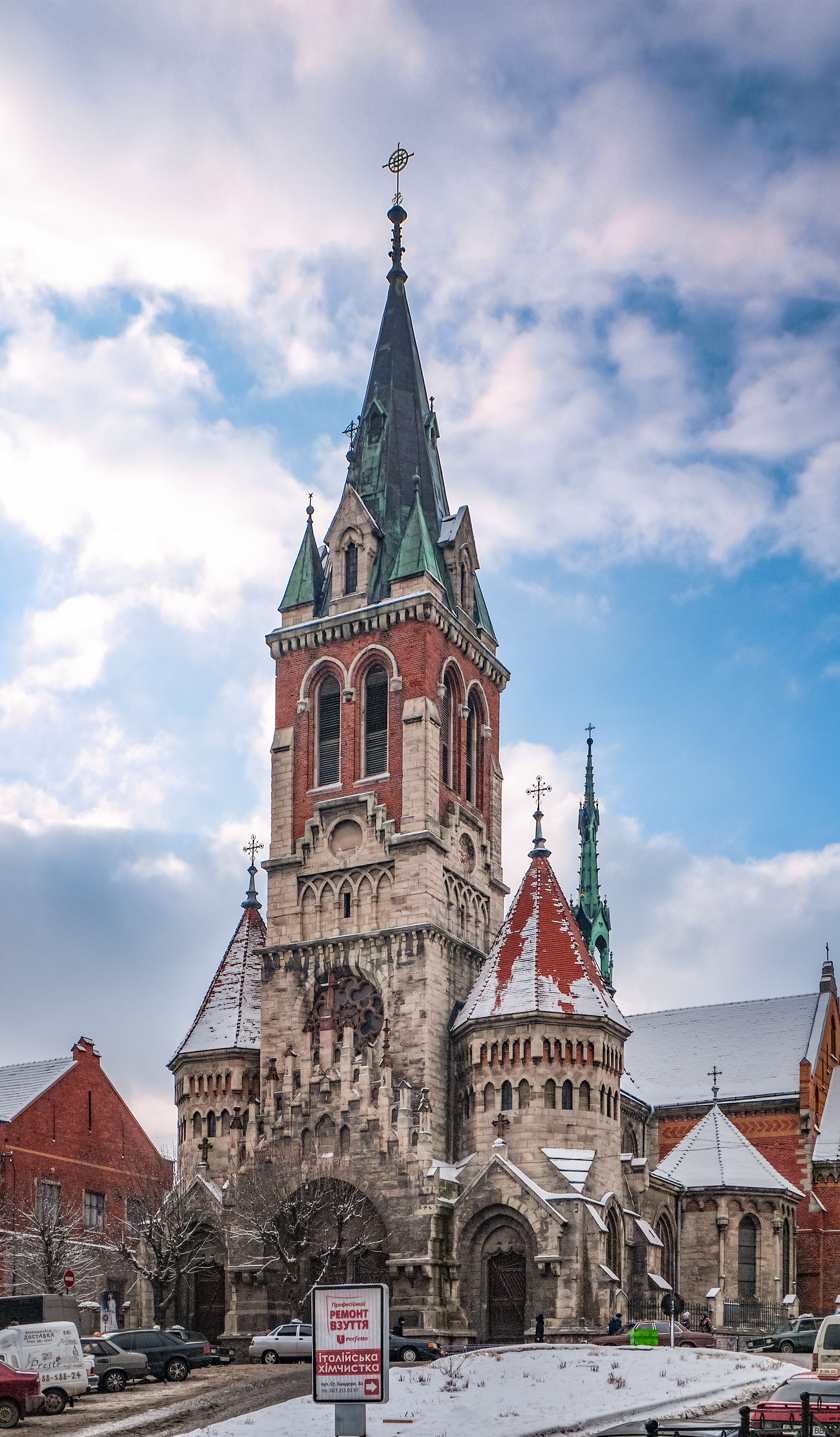
- St. Stanislaus Church

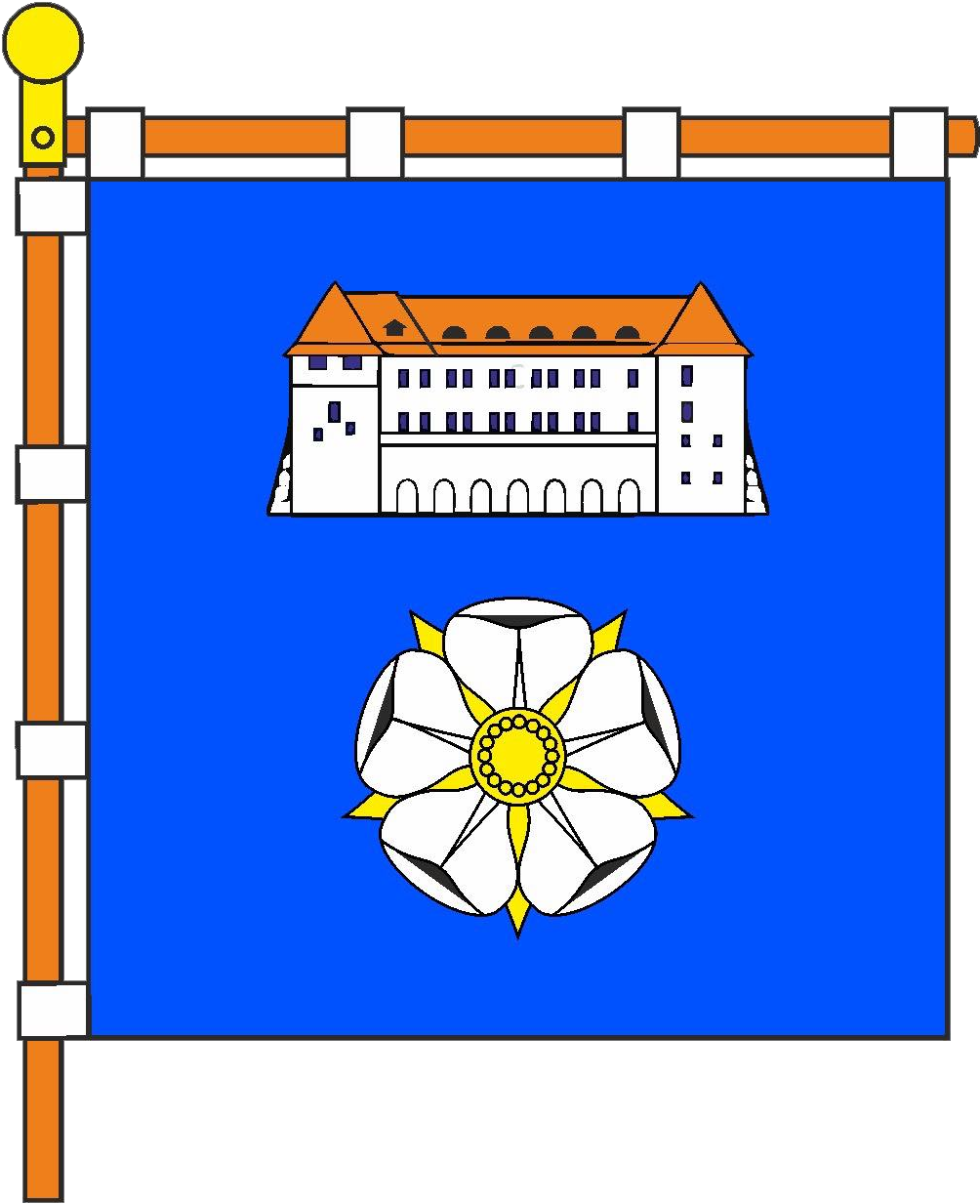
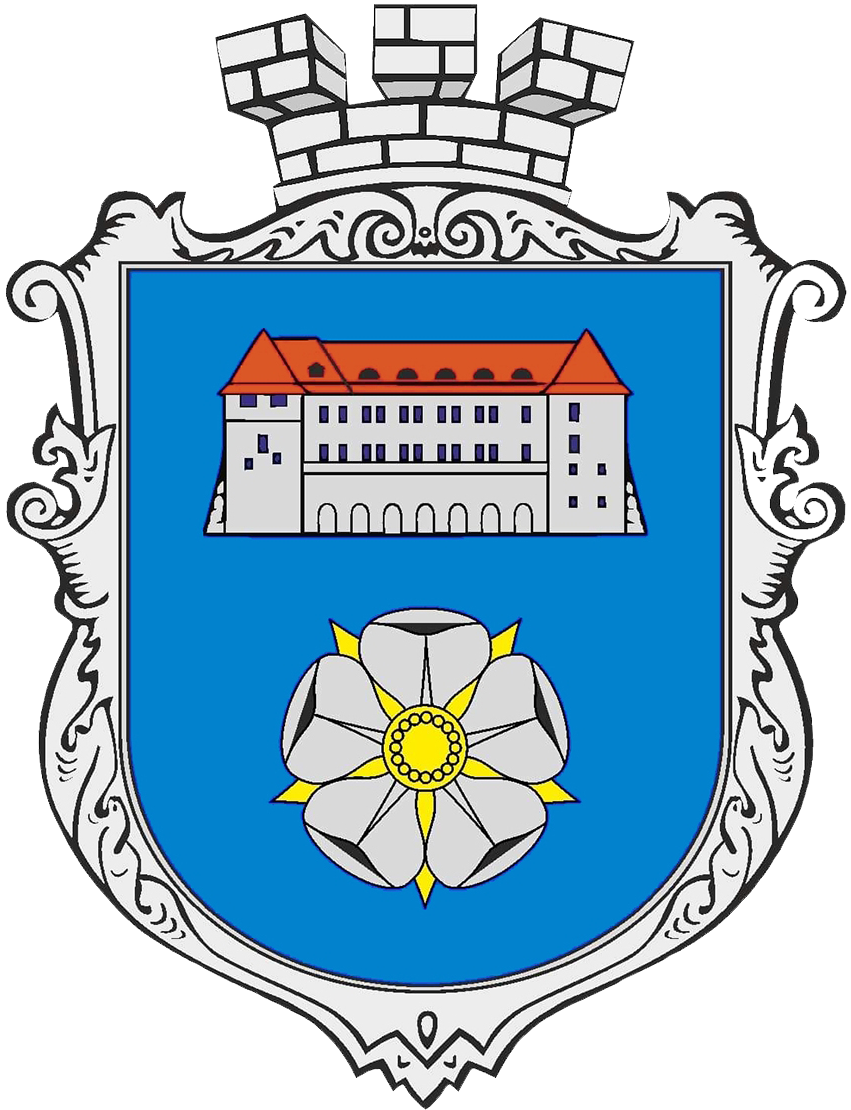
- Flag Coat of arms
- Interactive map of Chortkiv
- Location of Chortkiv in Ukraine Chortkiv (Ukraine)
- Coordinates: 49°00′27″N 25°47′26″E
- Country: Ukraine
- Oblast: Ternopil Oblast
- Raion: Chortkiv Raion
- Hromada: Chortkiv urban hromada
- Magdeburg rights: 1533
- City status: 1939

Government
  - City Mayor: Volodymyr Shmatko

Area
  - Total: 30 km^{2} (12 sq mi)
- Elevation: 218 m (715 ft)

Population (2022)
  - Total: 28,279
  - Density: 940/km^{2} (2,400/sq mi)
- Time zone: UTC+2 (EET)
  - Summer (DST): UTC+3 (EEST)
- Postal code: 48500—48509
- Area code: +380 3552

Chortkiv (Ukrainian: Чортків, IPA: [tʃortˈkiu̯]; Polish: Czortków; Yiddish: טשארטקאוו, romanized: Tshortkov) is a city in Chortkiv Raion, Ternopil Oblast, western Ukraine. It is the administrative center of Chortkiv Raion, housing the district's local administration buildings. Chortkiv hosts the administration of Chortkiv urban hromada, one of the hromadas of Ukraine. Population: 28,279 (2022 estimate).

Chortkiv is located in the northern part of the historic region of Galician Podolia on the banks of the Seret River.

In the past Chortkiv was the home of many Hasidic Jews; it was a notable shtetl and had a significant number of Jews residing there prior to the Holocaust. Today, Chortkiv is a regional commercial and small-scale manufacturing center. Among its architectural monuments is a fortress built in the 16th and 17th centuries as well as historic wooden churches of the 17th and 18th centuries.

== History ==
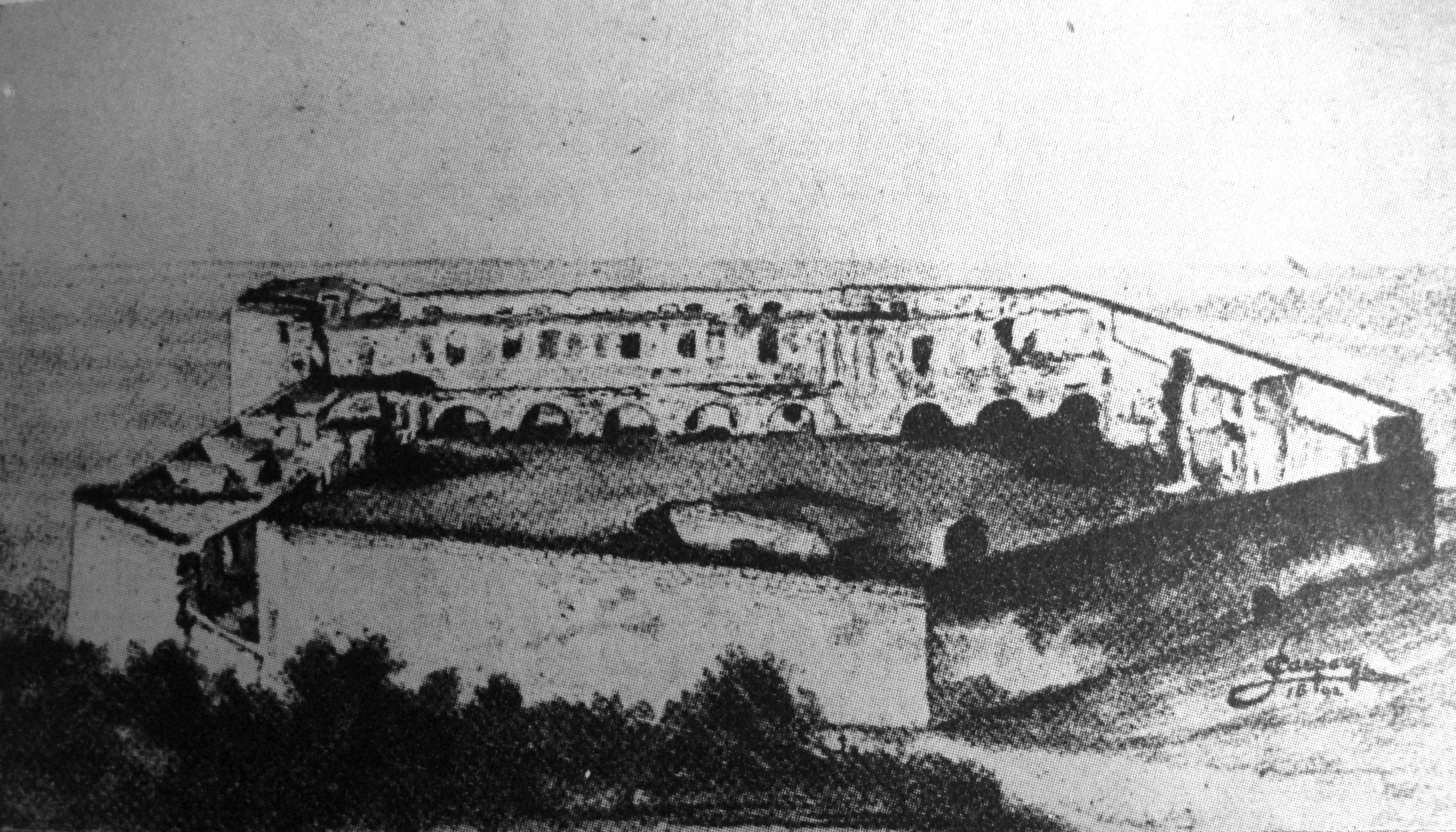
Chortkiv Castle

The first historical mention of Chortkiv dates to 1522, when Polish King Sigismund I the Old granted an ownership order for Jerzy Czortkowski over the town and allowed him to name it after himself—Czortków. The small community, numbering at 50 families, were almost all massacred during the Khmelnytsky Uprising of 1648–9. Jewish leadership opposed the resettlement of Jews in Chortkiv until 1705. During that time, the town was also granted Magdeburg rights. However, Chortkiv would later decline in the second half of the 17th century during Ottoman Expansion of central Europe. The town was taken over by Ottoman Empire, whose rule lasted 27 years. It was part of the short-lived Turkish Podolia Eyalet, which lasted from 1672 to 1699. During this period, it was nahiya centre in Yazlofça sanjak as Çortkuv (Spelled as Chortkoov in Turkish). After First Partition of Poland Chortkiv came under Austro-Hungarian rule which lasted from 1772 to 1918, during the time of which it was the center of the Chortkiv Bezirk except brief Russian rule between 1809 and 1815 as part of Tarnopol Governorate. On June 8, 1919, the Ukrainian Galician Army broke for couple months through the Polish front at Chortkiv and began the Chortkiv offensive. Soon afterwards, the town was seized by the Poles. It was ceded to sovereign Poland in the Peace Treaty of Riga between Poland, Soviet Russia (acting also on behalf of Soviet Belarus) and Soviet Ukraine, and remained part of the Tarnopol Voivodeship of the Second Polish Republic until the Soviet invasion of Poland in September 1939.

In 1931, the town had 19,000 inhabitants, 46.4 percent of whom were Polish Roman Catholics, 30 percent of whom were Ukrainian and Polish Jews, and 22.8 percent of whom were Ukrainian Greek Catholics.

Chortkiv was an important garrison of the Polish Border Defence Corps Brigade "Podole", whose commandant from 1935 to 1938 was General Stefan Rowecki. Furthermore, it was home to the 36th Reserve Infantry Division.

The town was annexed by the Soviet Union from September 17, 1939, until June 1941. Its Polish inhabitants, particularly students of the local high school, organized a failed uprising in January 1940, which would serve as the first Polish uprising of World War II. In the last days of June 1941, following the German invasion of the USSR, the Soviets executed an estimated 100 to 200 prisoners held in the local prison. The remaining prisoners were evacuated further east, either by train or on foot, while hundreds died due to the inhumane conditions of transport or at the hands of guards.

From 1941-1944 Chortkiv was annexed to Nazi Germany. The Jewish residents were persecuted and deported as part of the Holocaust. When the Nazis arrived, they proceeded to execute many of the local Jews, including the family of Charles Schumer, American Senate Majority Leader. The surviving Polish residents of the town were transferred to the Recovered Territories in the immediate postwar period (see Polish population transfers (1944–1946)). After the defeat of the Nazis by the Red Army in 1944, the town returned to Soviet control until in 1991 it became part of independent Ukraine.

Due to heavy destruction of Ternopil, in 1944 Chortkiv served as a regional seat.

In January 1989 the population was 26 681 people.

In January 2013 the population was 29 640 people.

In 2019, at the 40-meter height of the tower of the Saint Stanislaus church in Chortkiv, archaeologist, researcher of fortifications and antiquities Volodymyr Dobrianskyi discovered a detonator of a shrapnel projectile, according to its flight trajectory determined that the 1st, 3rd, 4th and 7th cannon regiments (64 guns) under the command of Ataman Kirill Karas during the Chortkiv offensive (June 7–28, 1919) were stationed in the woods west of the village of Shmankivtsi in the Chortkiv district.

Until 18 July 2020, Chortkiv was designated as a city of oblast significance and did not belong to Chortkiv Raion even though it was the center of the raion. As part of the administrative reform of Ukraine, which reduced the number of raions of Ternopil Oblast to three, the city was merged into Chortkiv Raion.

The former Chortkiv Air Base is located nearby.

== Religion ==
=== Existings ===
- Church of the Dormition (1584; wooden; restored in the 1990s);
- Church of the Ascension (UGCC; 1630; wooden; rebuilt in 1717; restored in 1997);
- Church of the Immaculate Conception of the Blessed Virgin Mary (UGCC; 1854; brick);
- Church of the Intercession (OCU, 1905; brick);
- Church of the Nativity of the Blessed Virgin Mary (OCU; brick);
- Saint Volodymyr the Great church (under construction since 1993; OCU);
- Church of the Transfiguration (UGCC; 2007; brick);
- Saint Michael church (UGCC, 2008; stone);
- Cathedral of Sts. Peter and Paul (Buchach Diocese of the UGCC, 2001);
- one men's monastery (the Convent of the Holy Family) and two women's monasteries (the Congregation of the Sisters of the Holy Family and the Congregation of the Myrrh-Bearing Sisters) of the UGCC;
- Saint Stanislaus church (1610; rebuilt in the early 20th century; restored in 1989);
- two Jewish synagogues – the main one (1680s) and the new one (1909; architect Hans Geldkremer);
- the chapels of Our Lady of Lourdes (1908) and Our Lady of the Cross (2013).

=== No longer existing ===
- Church of the Holy Trinity (UGCC; 1607–?)
- Saint Nicholas Church (UGCC; 1714–1801)
- Basil of Caesarea Monastery (UGCC; 1607–1792)

== Geography ==
=== Climate ===
Climate data for Chortkiv (1981–2010)
Month	Jan	Feb	Mar	Apr	May	Jun	Jul	Aug	Sep	Oct	Nov	Dec	Year
Mean daily maximum °C (°F)	−0.7 (30.7)	0.9 (33.6)	6.0 (42.8)	13.9 (57.0)	20.1 (68.2)	22.6 (72.7)	24.7 (76.5)	24.2 (75.6)	18.9 (66.0)	12.9 (55.2)	5.3 (41.5)	0.2 (32.4)	12.4 (54.3)
Daily mean °C (°F)	−3.5 (25.7)	−2.5 (27.5)	1.8 (35.2)	8.5 (47.3)	14.3 (57.7)	17.1 (62.8)	19.0 (66.2)	18.3 (64.9)	13.5 (56.3)	8.2 (46.8)	2.2 (36.0)	−2.4 (27.7)	7.9 (46.2)
Mean daily minimum °C (°F)	−6.1 (21.0)	−5.3 (22.5)	−1.6 (29.1)	4.0 (39.2)	9.2 (48.6)	12.3 (54.1)	14.1 (57.4)	13.4 (56.1)	9.1 (48.4)	4.5 (40.1)	−0.3 (31.5)	−4.8 (23.4)	4.0 (39.2)
Average precipitation mm (inches)	31.3 (1.23)	39.1 (1.54)	35.7 (1.41)	47.8 (1.88)	80.7 (3.18)	90.3 (3.56)	92.0 (3.62)	72.8 (2.87)	59.9 (2.36)	37.4 (1.47)	37.8 (1.49)	39.0 (1.54)	663.8 (26.13)
Average precipitation days (≥ 1.0 mm)	7.8	8.4	8.6	8.4	10.0	10.1	10.2	8.6	8.3	6.9	8.0	9.4	104.7
Average relative humidity (%)	84.1	81.6	76.5	68.2	67.7	72.5	73.0	73.9	77.4	80.2	85.2	86.4	77.2
Source: World Meteorological Organization

== Notable people ==
- Anna Blazhenko (born 1955), Ukrainian journalist
- Sasza Blonder (1909–1949), Polish painter
- Karl Emil Franzos (1848–1904), Austrian novelist
- Bernard Hausner (1874–1938), rabbi, politician and diplomat
- Oleksii Hunovskyi (1882–1961), Ukrainian Greek Catholic priest, composer, public figure, educator, political prisoner and head of the Chortkiv District National Council of the ZUNR
- Pinchas Horowitz (1731–1805), rabbi and Talmudist
- Halyna Hrytskiv (1937–2016), Ukrainian public and cultural figure, poet, publicist, and Easter egg maker
- Jerzy Janicki (1928–2007), Polish writer and reporter
- Vasyl Makhno (born 1964), Ukrainian poet, essayist, and translator
- Vasyl Marmus (1992–2022), Ukrainian musician, actor, soldier
- Shmelke of Nikolsburg (1746–1778), one of the great early Chasidic Rebbes
- Ludwik Noss (1848–1913), Austrian government official, philanthropist, public and educational figure; burgomaster of Chortkiv
- Volodymyr Petrashyk (born 1985), Ukrainian art historian, art critic, participant in the Russo-Ukrainian War
- Olha Pidvysotska (1899–?), Ukrainian soldier, teacher
- Roxolana Roslak (born 1940), Ukrainian soprano singer
- Kateryna Rubchakova (1881–1919), Ukrainian actress and singer
- Tadeusz Wazewski (1896–1972), Polish scholar, mathematician, professor of Jagiellonian University
- Volodymyr Zabolotnyi (born 1960), Ukrainian actor, public and religious figure

== Gallery ==
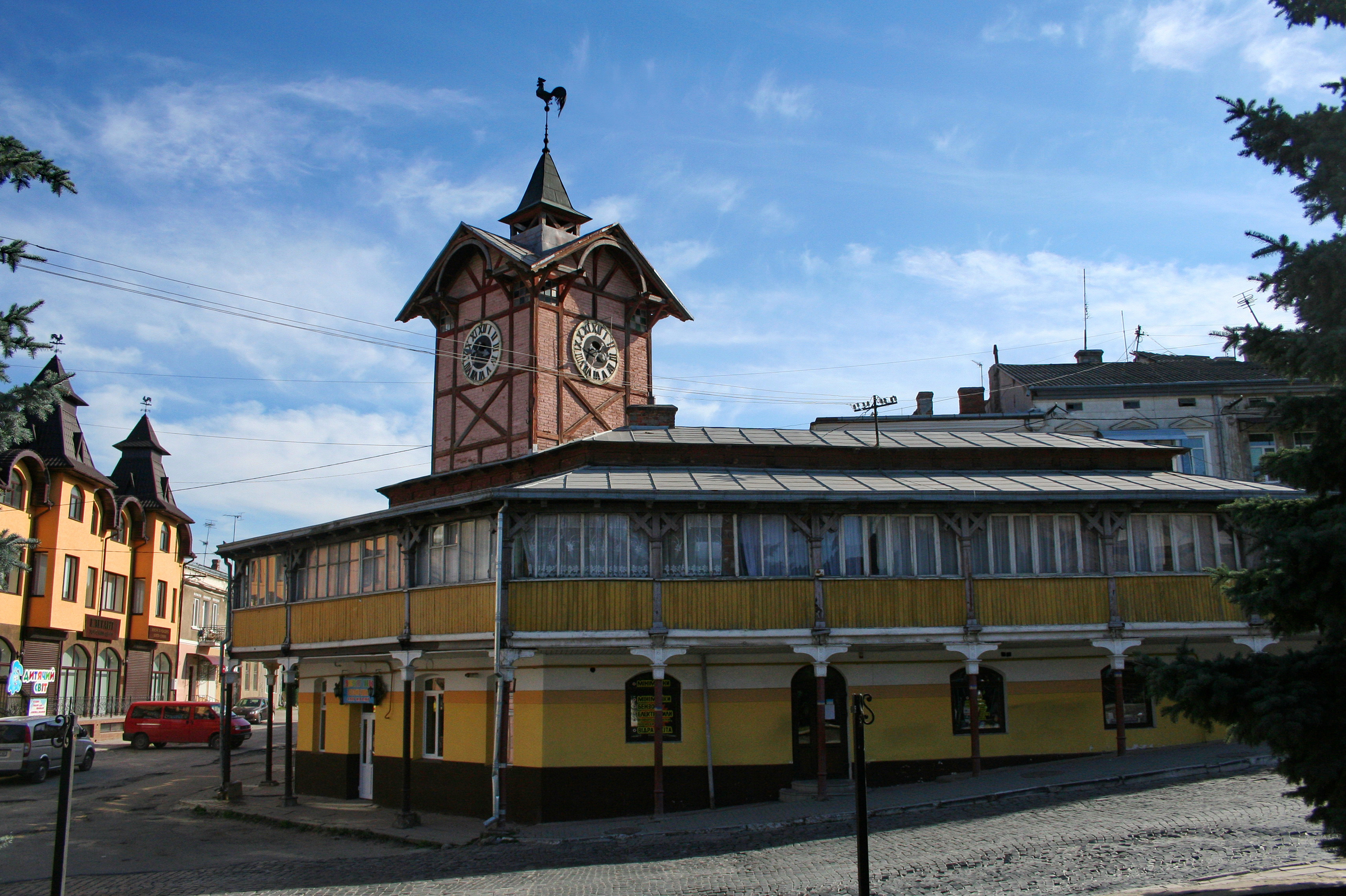
Town hall

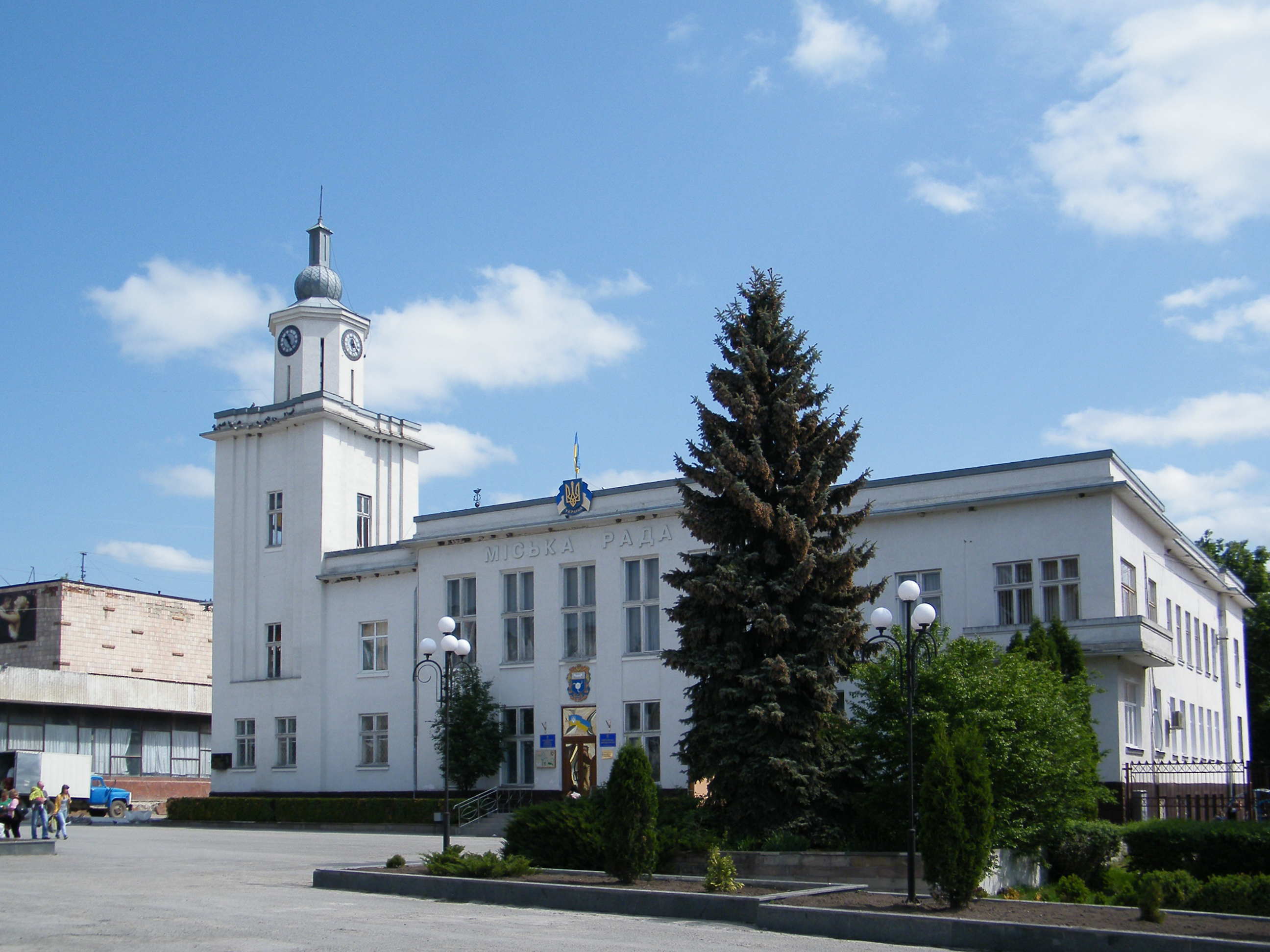
City hall

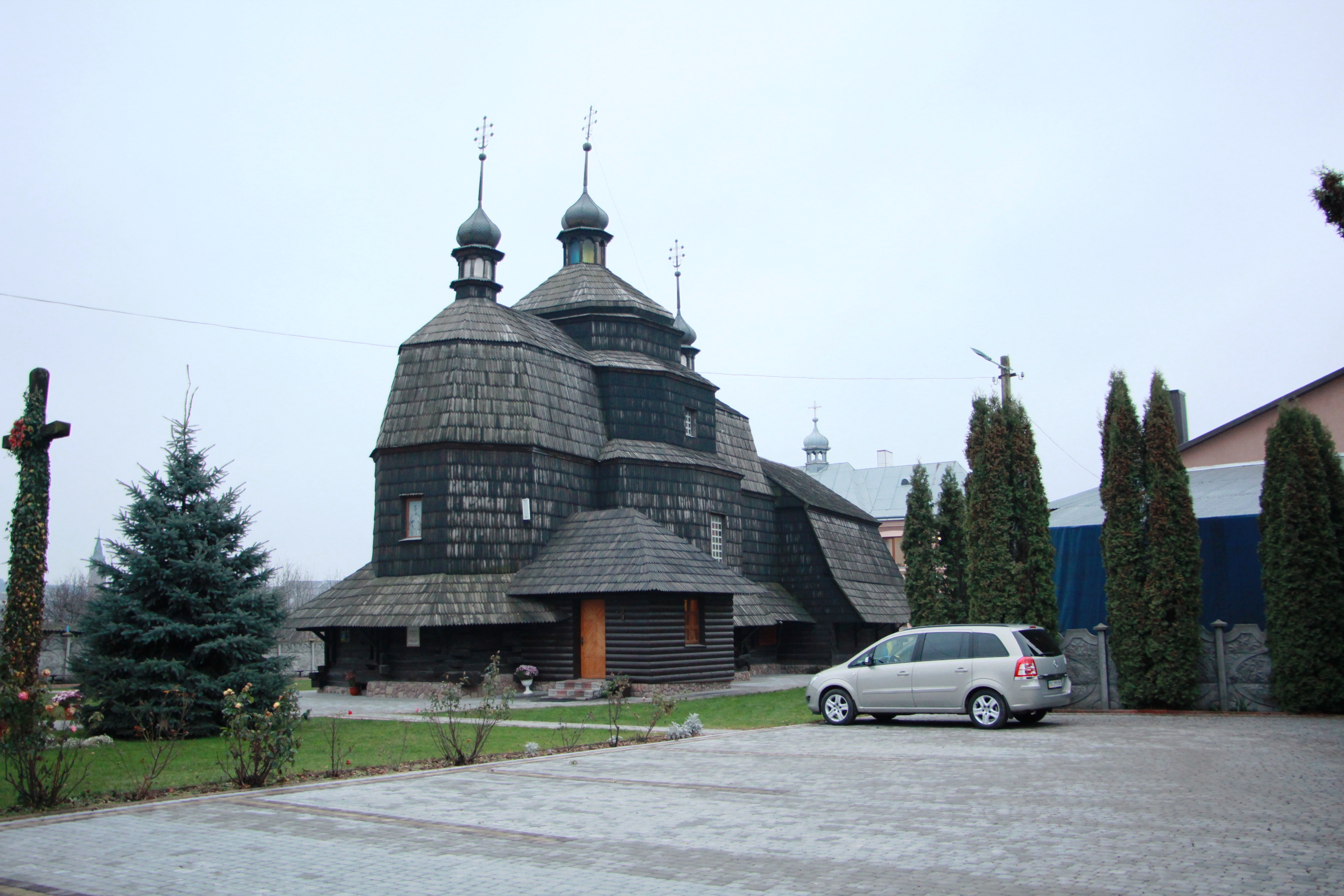
Assumption Church

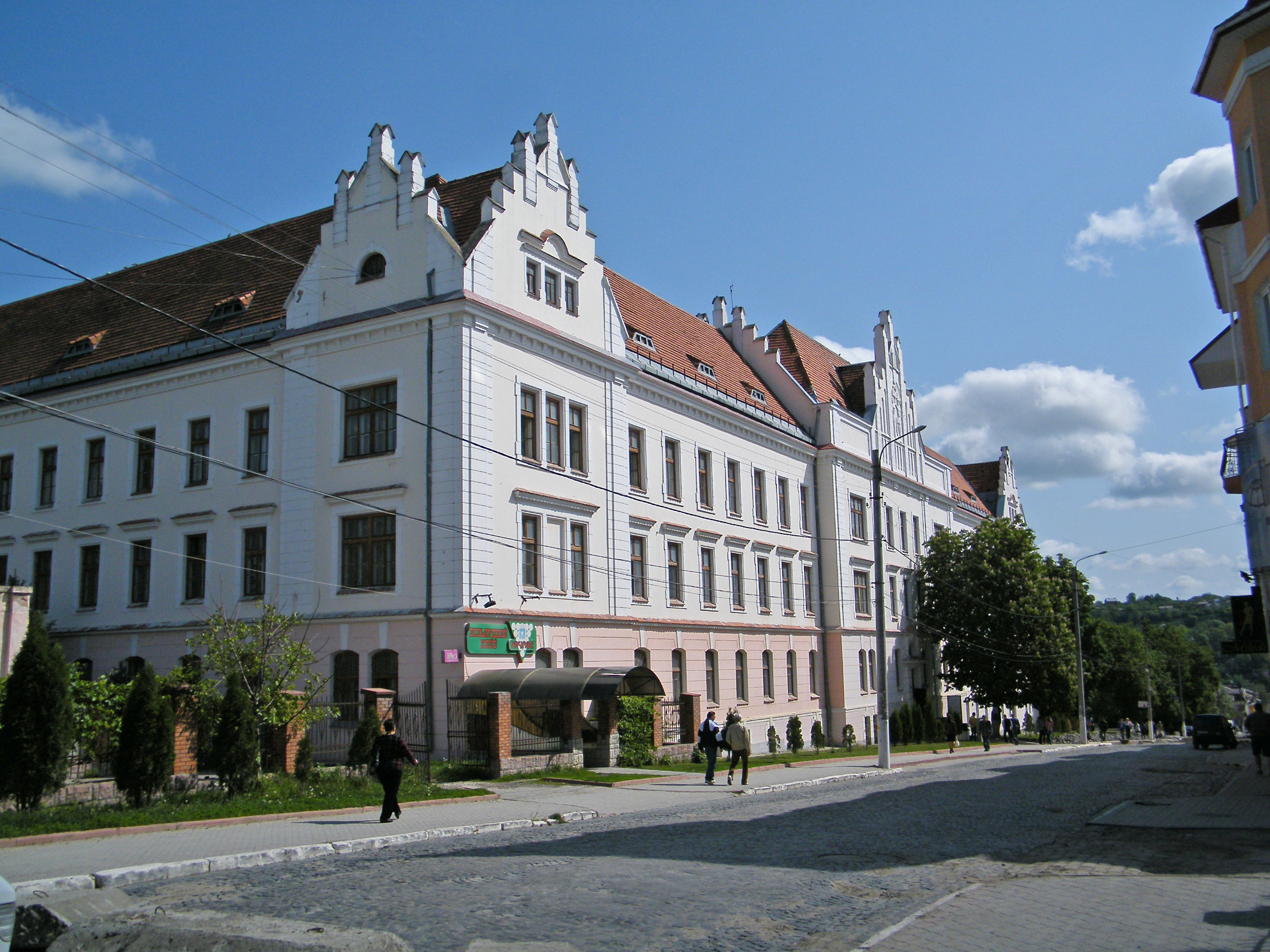
Historic county court building

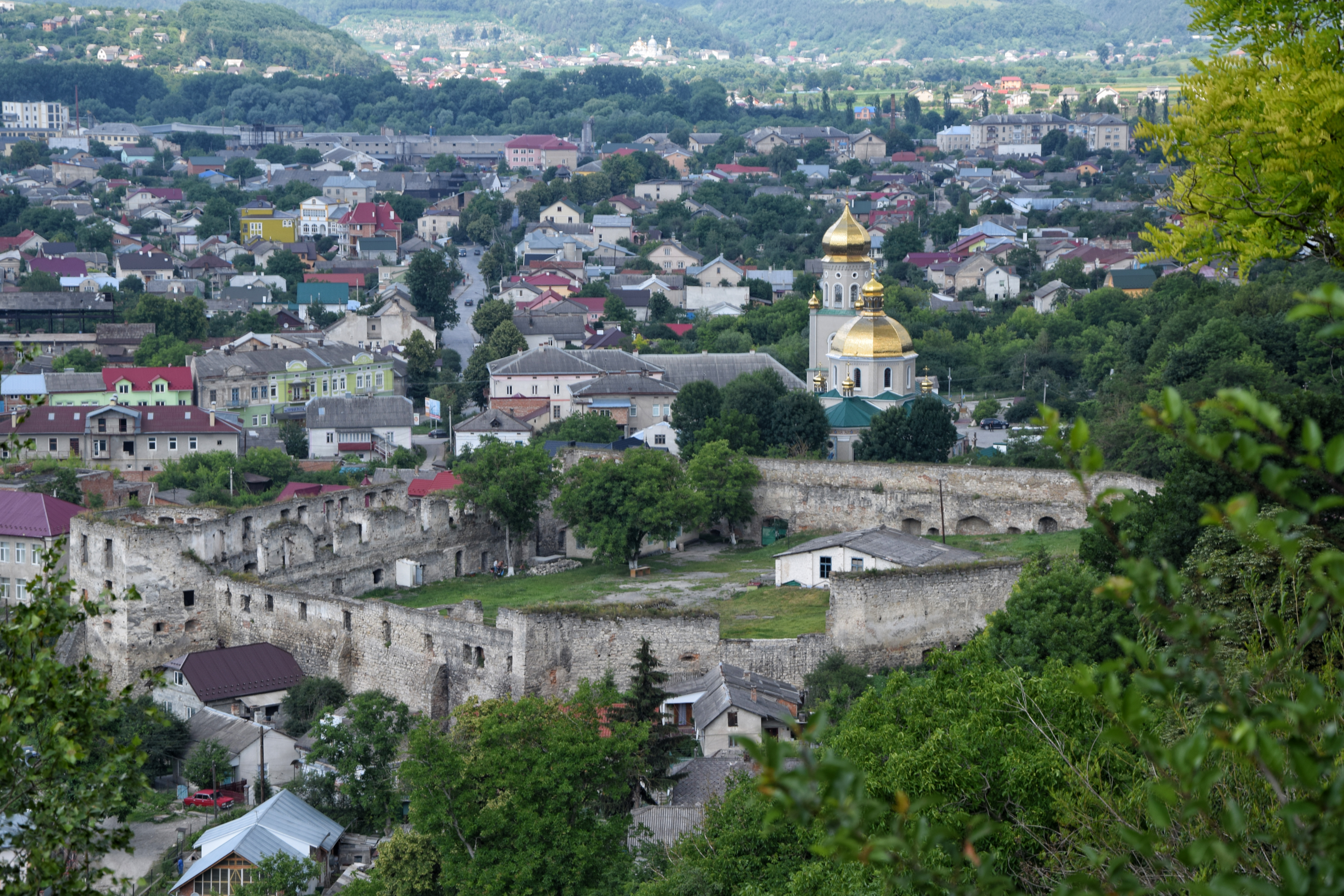
Ruins of Chortkiv Castle and Regimental Church

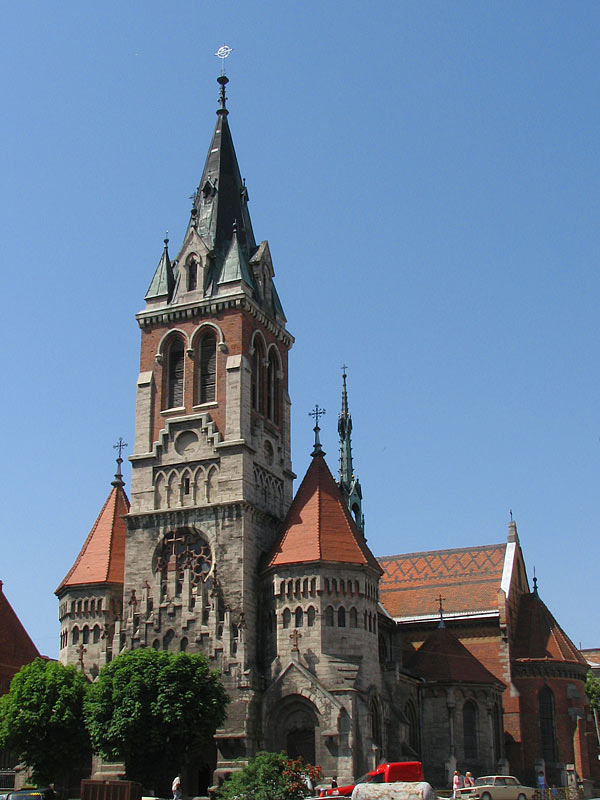
St. Stanislaus Church

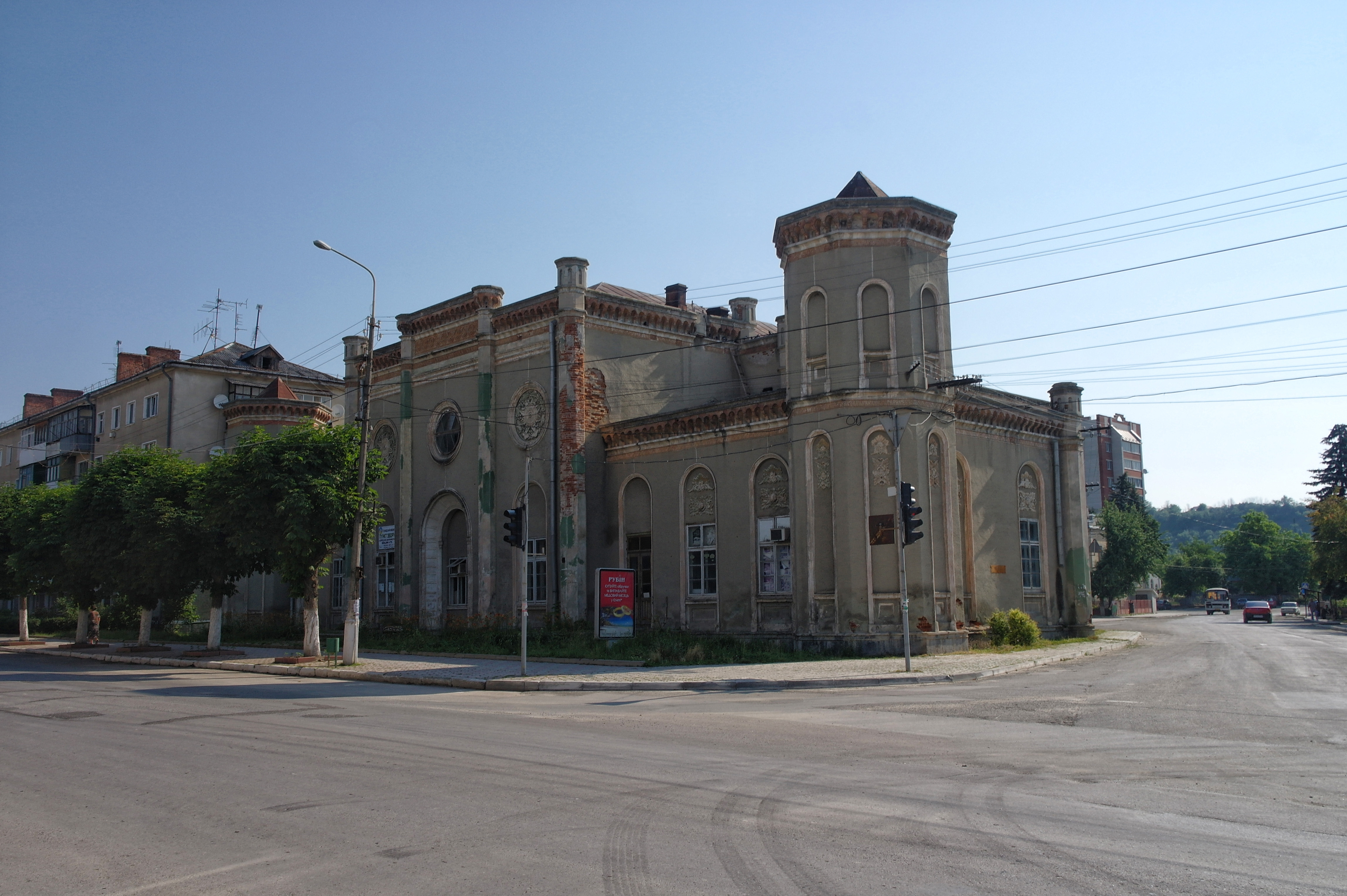
Hasidic synagogue

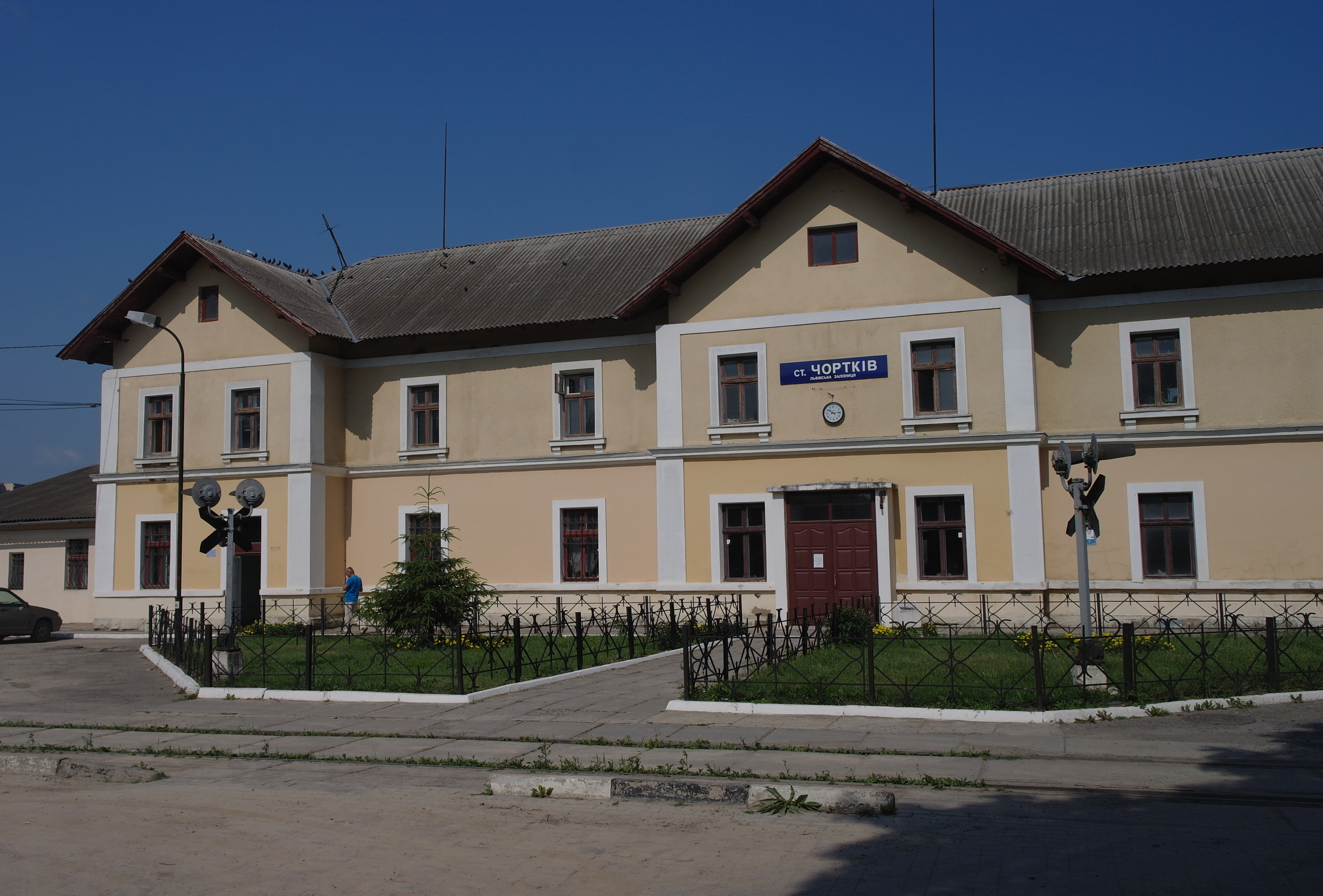
Railway station

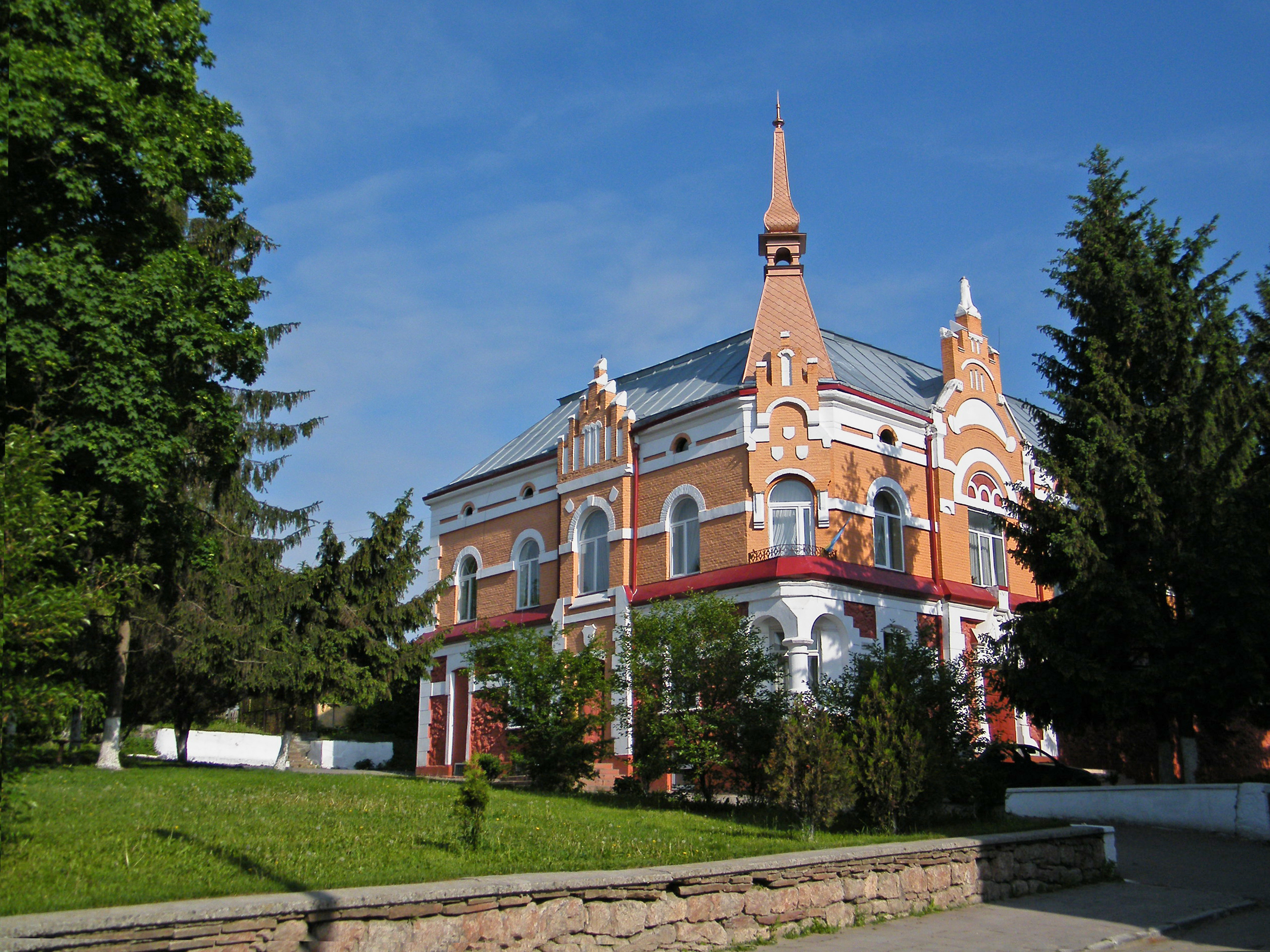
House of Culture

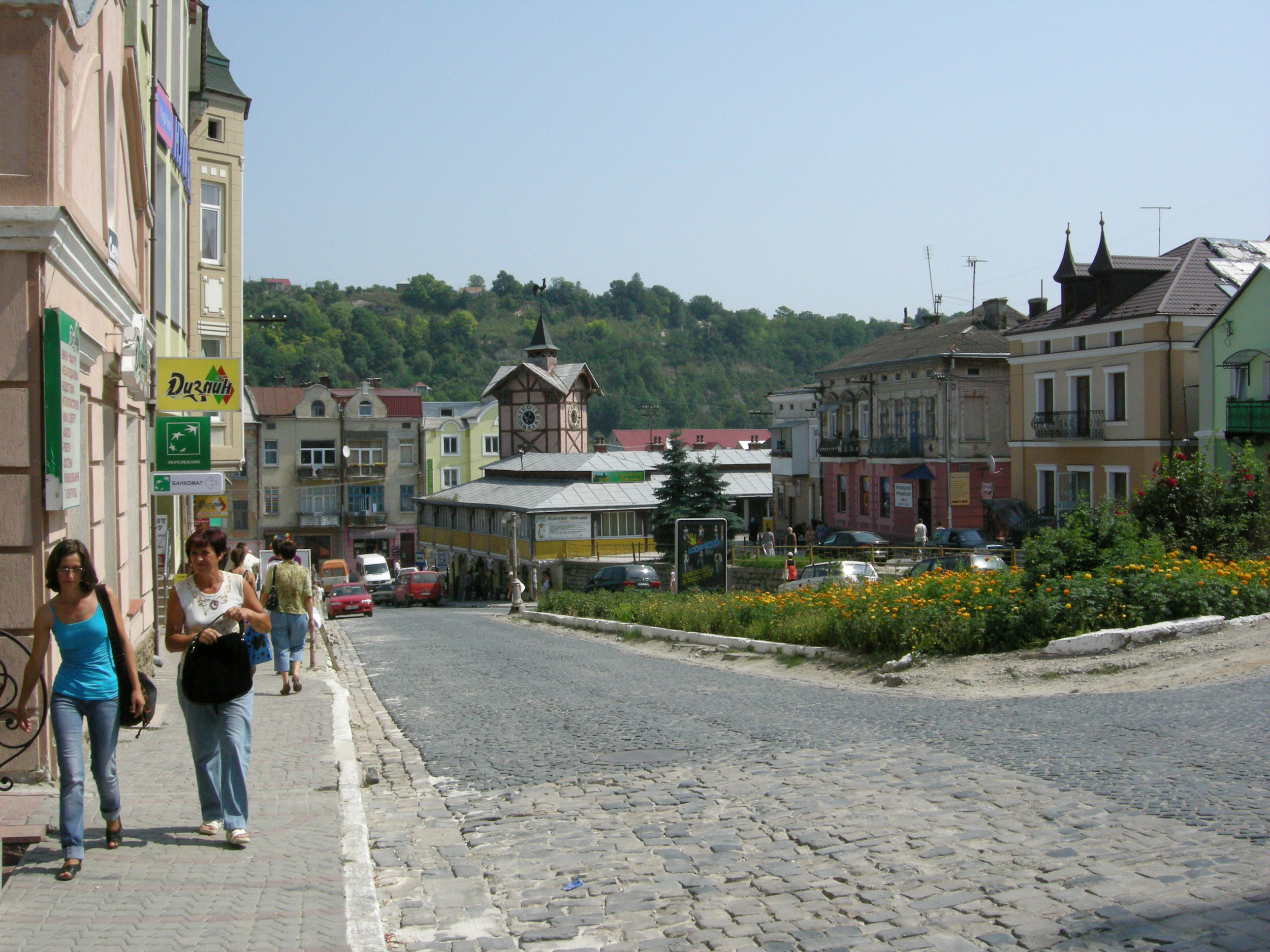
City centre and the old Town Hall

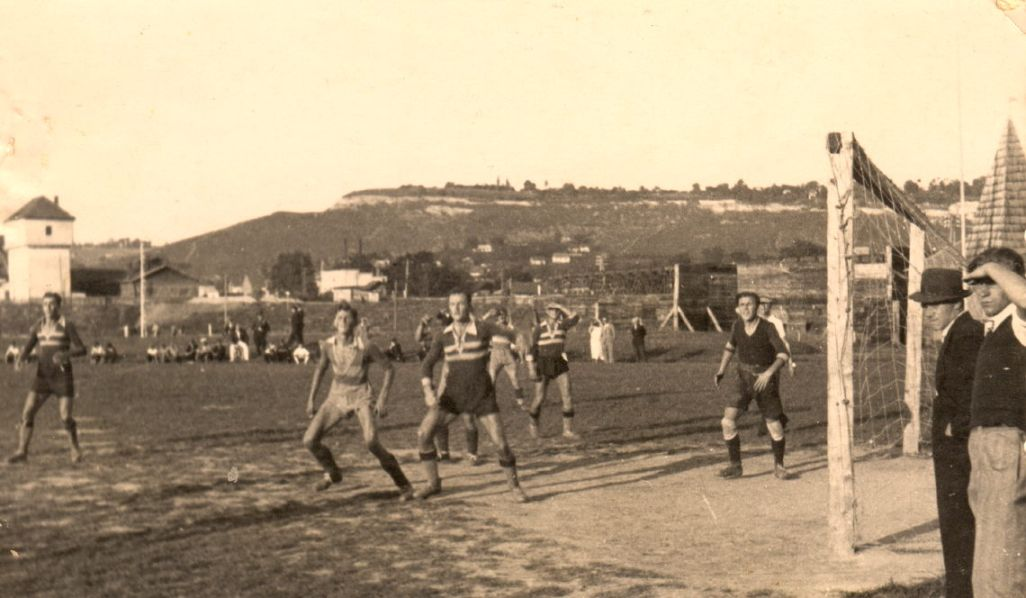
Football Match at Stadium, 1938

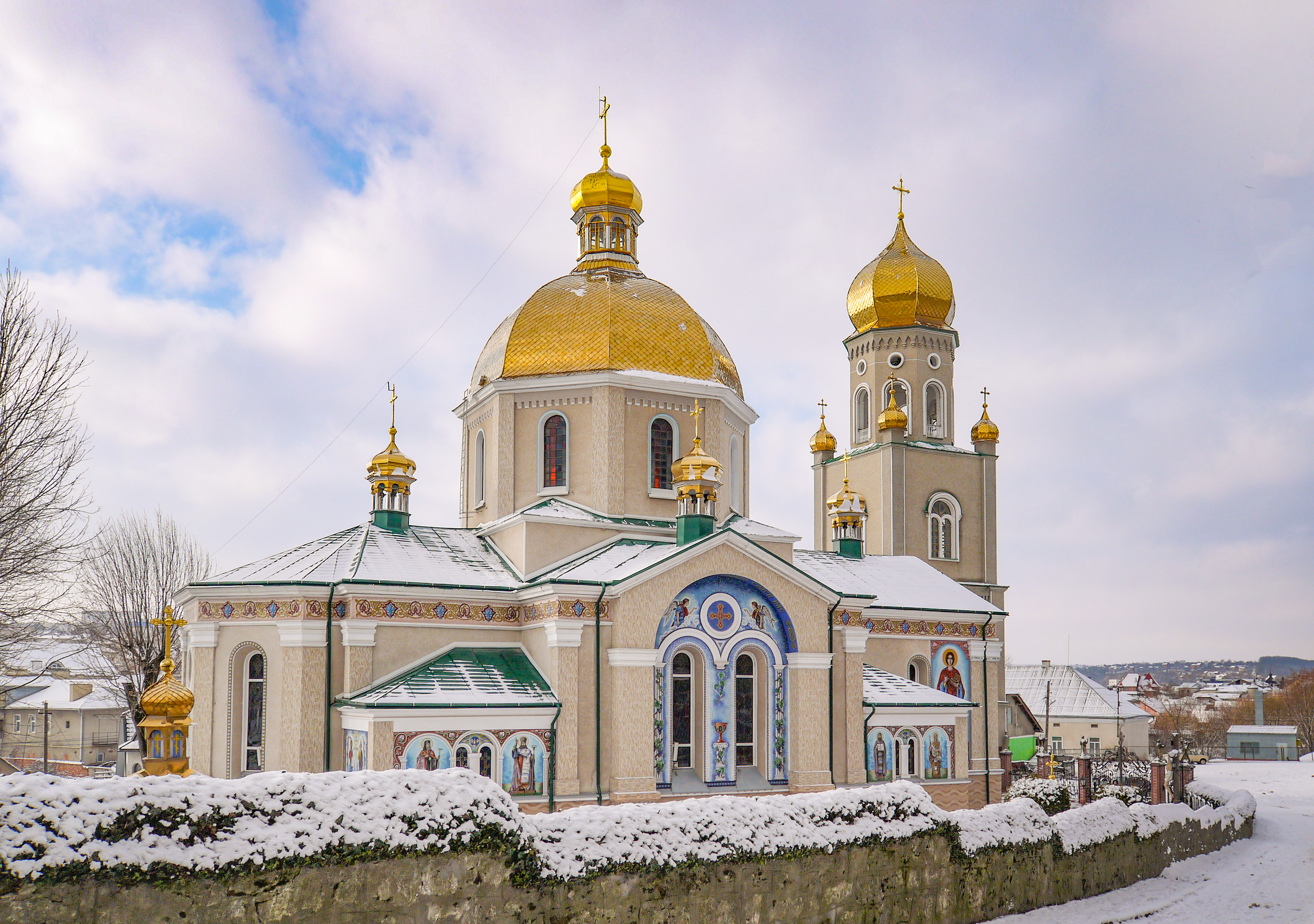
Peter and Paul Cathedral

== Twin towns ==
Chortkiv is twinned with:

- Dobrodzień, Poland
- Leżajsk, Poland
- Zawadzkie, Poland
- Korczyna, Poland
- Talsi, Latvia
- Béziers, France
- Grosuplje, Slovenia
- Căușeni, Moldova
- Karlskrona, Sweden
- Bad Soden-Salmünster, Germany
- Whitehorse, Canada
- Ajka, Hungary
- Caravaggio, Italy
- Lexington, United States

== See also ==
- Chortkov (Hasidic dynasty)
- Old Chortkiv Castle
