= Stavky (river) =

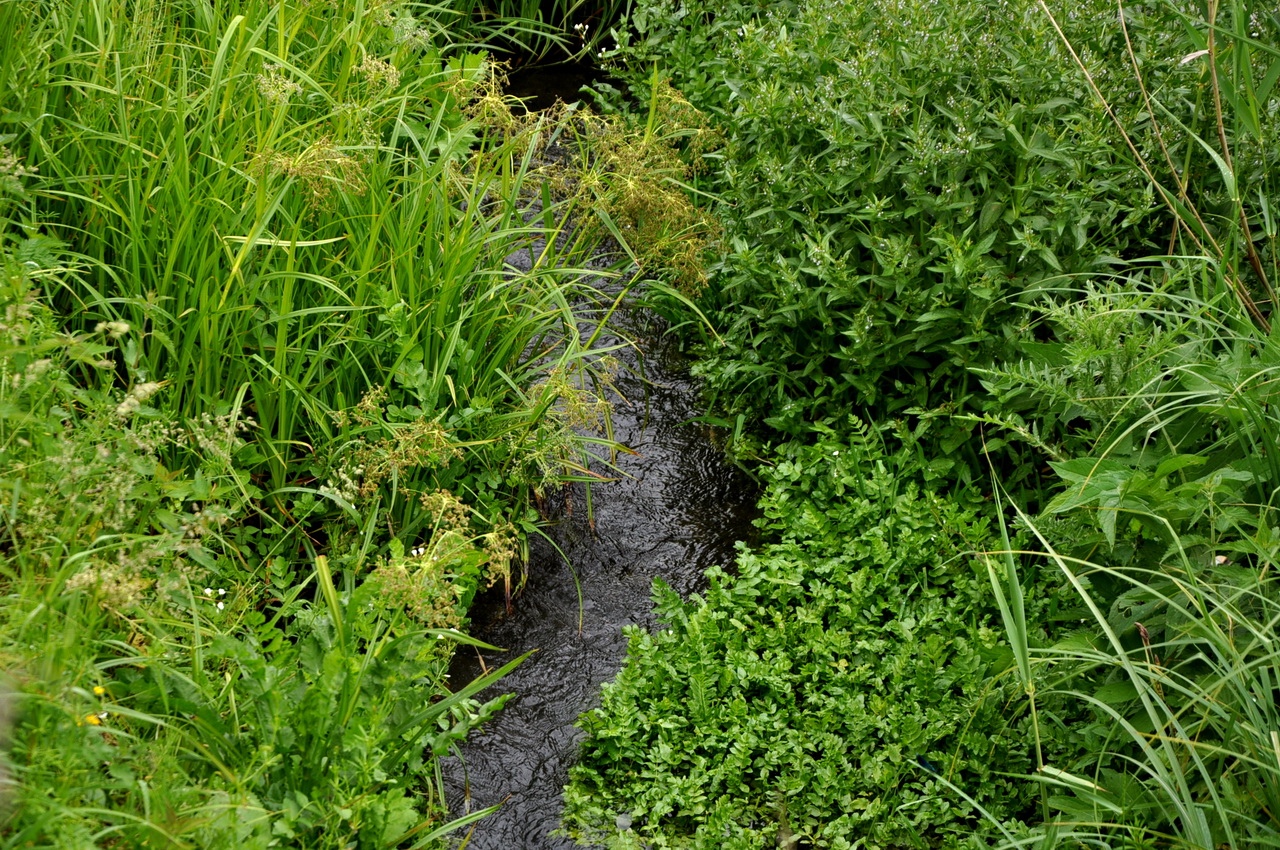
- Stavky river
- Native name: Ставки (Ukrainian)

Location
- Country: Ukraine

Physical characteristics
- Source
  - location: Pastushe
  - coordinates: 49°01′50″N 25°52′20″E
- Mouth: Nichlava
  - coordinates: 49°00′34″N 25°55′26″E
- Length: 4.8 km (3.0 mi)

Basin features
- Progression: Dniester→ Dniester Estuary→ Black Sea

Stavky (Ukrainian: Ставки) is a river in Ukraine, which flows within the Chortkiv Raion of Ternopil Oblast. Right tributary of the river Nichlava from the Dniester basin.

The spring is located near the village of Pastushe. Length 4.80 km. It flows near the Kuhutivka tract to Nichlavka.

The Stavky River got its name because it flows near the Shmankivtsi pond.

== Sources ==
- "Stawki". Geographical Dictionary of the Kingdom of Poland (in Polish). 11. Warszawa: Kasa im. Józefa Mianowskiego. 1890. p. 303.
- Ставки // Словник гідронімів України / Уклад. І. М. Железняк, А. П. Корепанова, Л. Т. Масенко [та ін.]; Редкол. : К. К. Цілуйко (голова) та ін. — К. : Наукова думка, 1979. — С. 524.
- Огородник, М. Маловідомий струмок Чортківщини // Чортківський Вісник. — 2018. — № 37—38 (21 вересня). — С. 7. — (Краєзнавство).
