= Church of the Ascension in Chortkiv =

Greek Catholic church in Chortkiv, Ukraine

Church of the Ascension
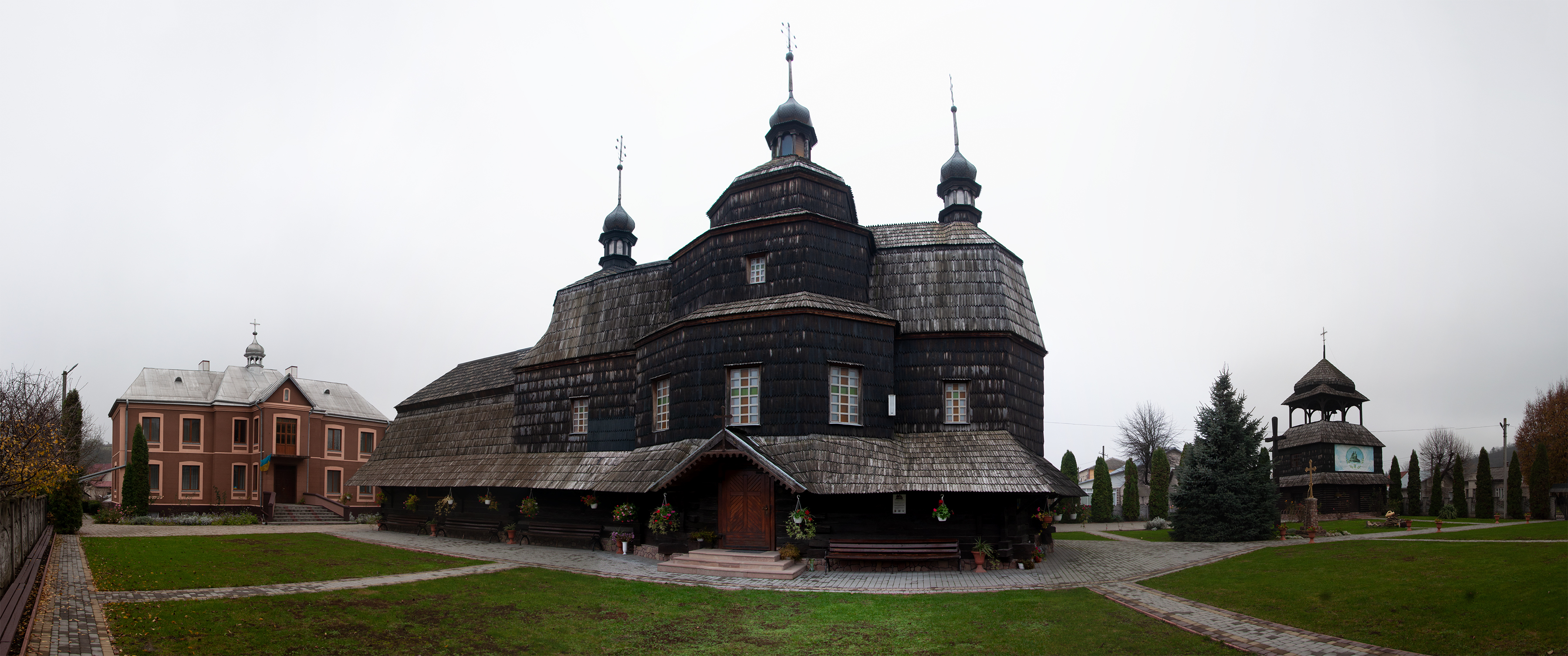

- Location within Ternopil Oblast

Religion
- Affiliation: Ukrainian Greek Catholic Church

Location
- Location: Chortkiv
- Coordinates: 49°01′29″N 25°47′34″E

Immovable Monument of National Significance of Ukraine
- Official name: Вознесенська церква (дер.) (Ascension Church (wooden))
- Type: Architecture
- Reference no.: 190067

Church of the Ascension (Ukrainian: Церква Вознесіння Господнього) is a Greek Catholic Parish Church (UGCC) in Chortkiv of the Chortkiv urban hromada of the Chortkiv Raion of the Ternopil Oblast, and an architectural monument of national significance.

== History ==
The parish was founded in 1717, but the church was built earlier, in 1630. It was severely damaged by Turkish and Tatar attacks in 1640 and 1672 but was completely rebuilt in 1717. At that time, the church, which was previously named after St. Nicholas, received a new name—the Ascension Church—and the parish became Greek Catholic. Construction was funded by residents of Dolishnia Vyhnanka, as well as the church brotherhood and artisans of Chortkiv.

Throughout the early and mid-20th century, the church was neglected and inactive. In July 1967, architect V. Zakharov developed a restoration project, after which the church received the status of a state monument of 18th-century wooden architecture. After 1946, Greek Catholics continued to hold underground services, and the first public service after leaving the underground took place on Easter in 1989 in a chapel in the cemetery in Syniakove. From 2003 to 2014, Fr. Andrii Melnyk managed to attract new parishioners and carry out large-scale restoration work.

On 28 May 2017, to mark the 300th anniversary of the church, the Divine Liturgy was led by Metropolitan Vasyl Semeniuk and Eparch Dmytro Hryhorak.

The following groups are active at the parish: the "Pope's Worldwide Prayer Network" brotherhood, the "Mothers in Prayer" and "Ukrainian Youth for Christ" communities, as well as a Bible study group and the "Mercy" society. The parish owns a rectory.

== Abbots ==
- at. Petro Dudynskyi (1890-1905)
- at. Yakiv Tymchuk
- at. Didych
- at. Yosyf Bilan
- at. Mykhailo Korzhynskyi
- at. Taras Senkiv
- at. Hryhorii Kanak
- at. Roman Honcharyk (1994-2003)
- at. Andrii Melnyk (since 2003)
- at. Volodymyr Bilinchuk (2009-2013)
- at. Marian Lemchuk (since 2013)

== See also ==
- Wooden churches in Ukraine

== Sources ==
- м. Чортків. Церква Вознесіння Господнього (Чортків). W: Бучацька єпархія УГКЦ. Парафії, монастирі, храми. Шематизм / Автор концепції Б. Куневич; керівник проєкту, науковий редактор Я. Стоцький, Тернопіль: ТОВ «Новий колір», 2014, s. 358.: іл., ISBN 978-966-2061-30-7. (ukr.)
