= Olha Pidvysotska =

Ukrainian soldier, teacher (1899–?)

- Ольга Спиридонівна Підвисоцька
- Born: Olha Spyrydonivna Pidvysotska; May 19, 1899; Chortkiv, Austria-Hungary (now Ukraine)
- Died: unknown unknown
- Education: Stanyslaviv Teachers' Seminary

Olha Pidvysotska (Ukrainian: Ольга Спиридонівна Підвисоцька; 19 May 1899 – unknown) was a Ukrainian soldier, teacher.

== Biography ==
Pidvysotska was born on 19 May 1899 in Chortkiv, now the Chortkiv urban hromada in the Chortkiv Raion of the Ternopil Oblast in Ukraine. A niece of Kost Pidvysotskyi.

She graduated from the Stanyslaviv Teachers' Seminary. During the World War I, she joined the Legion of Ukrainian Sich Riflemen, where she was the youngest soldier; and in the summer of 1917 she was in the Kosh of the Ukrainian Sich Riflemen. In the same year, she was forced to leave the military service and began teaching in Pasichna (now Ivano-Frankivsk region).

From November 1918, she joined the Ukrainian Galician Army, where she served at the headquarters of the 2nd Kuren of the 5th Sambir Brigade (military rank – Khorunzhyi). On 15 May 1919, in a battle with the Poles near the village of Hoshany (now Hradivka, Lviv Oblast), Pidvysotska took command of a hundred after her commander was wounded. She also participated in the Chortkiv offensive.

In July 1919, as part of the Ukrainian Galician Army, it moved to Dnieper Ukraine. It was stationed in Kamianets-Podilskyi and Vinnytsia. Later, after the defeat of the national liberation movement, Pidvysotska lived in Kyiv and Bila Tserkva. From 1924 she lived in Kharkiv, where she worked as a teacher until 1937.

On 4 November 1937, she was arrested by the NKVD (M. Balytskyi's husband was shot), and on 29 May 1938 she was sentenced to 5 years of exile in Kazakhstan. Her three minor children were sent to a special boarding school. Pidvysotska was rehabilitated in 1989.
