= Cathedral of Sts. Peter and Paul, Chortkiv =

Church in Ternopil Oblast, Ukraine

Cathedral of Sts. Peter and Paul, Chortkiv Катедральний собор верховних апостолів Петра і Павла
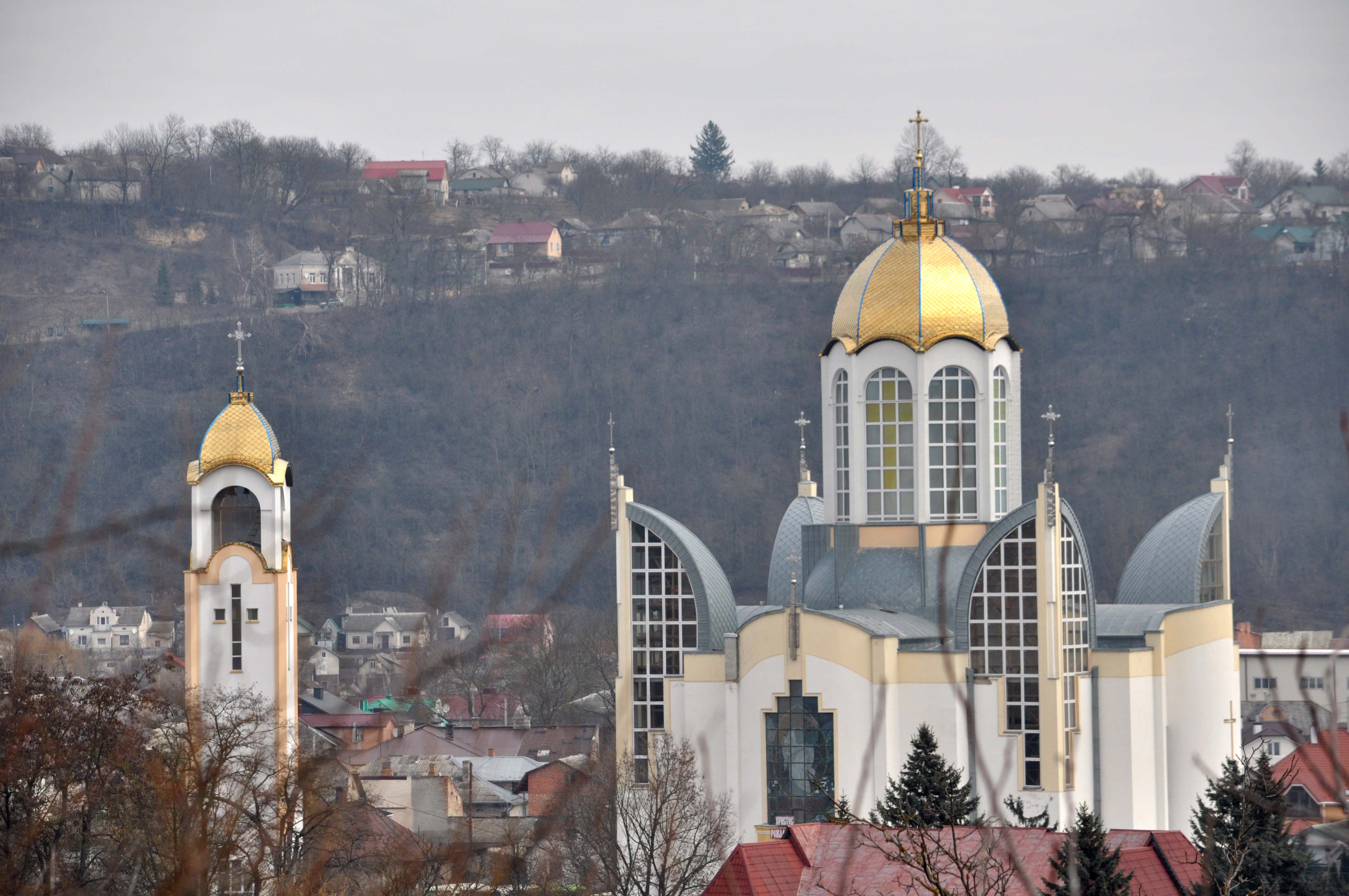

- Location within Ternopil Oblast

Religion
- Affiliation: Ukrainian Greek Catholic Church

Location
- Location: Chortkiv
- Coordinates: 49°00′55″N 25°47′50″E

The Cathedral of Sts. Peter and Paul (Ukrainian: Катедральний собор верховних апостолів Петра і Павла) is a Ukrainian Greek Catholic parish church in Chortkiv, Chortkiv urban hromada, Chortkiv Raion, Ternopil Oblast, Ukraine.

== History ==
Architect Serhii Hora designed the trident-shaped cathedral. The cornerstone was laid and consecrated on 19 March 1992. The cathedral was officially inaugurated and consecrated on 12 July 2001.

== Abbots ==
- at. Andrii Lemchuk (abbot)
- at. Mykola Malyi (vice-pastor)
- at. Volodymyr Hrytsiv (employee)
- at. Roman Harasymiv (employee)
