= Church of the Intercession in Chortkiv =

Church in Ternopil Oblast, Ukraine

Church of the Intercession, Chortkiv Церква Святої Покрови
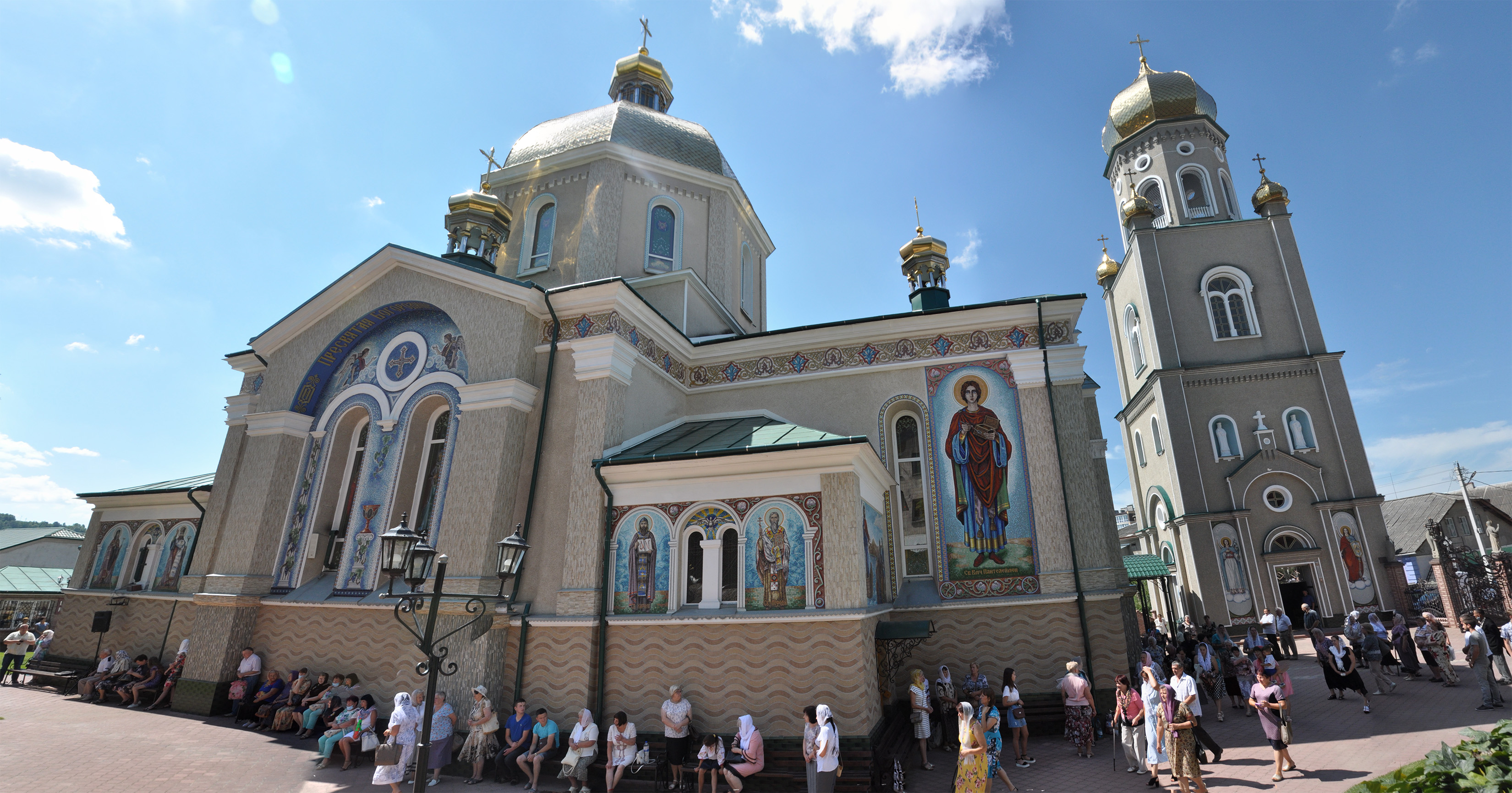

- Location within Ternopil Oblast

Religion
- Affiliation: Orthodox Church of Ukraine

Location
- Location: Chortkiv
- Coordinates: 49°01′21″N 25°48′03″E

Architecture
- Completed: 1905

Church of the Intercession (Ukrainian: Церква Святої Покрови) is an Orthodox parish church (OCU) in Chortkiv of the Chortkiv urban hromada of the Chortkiv Raion of the Ternopil Oblast, and an architectural monument of local importance.

== History ==
In 1903–1905 the church was built according to the project of Lviv architect Mykola Shashkevych and Chortkiv builder Andrii Drazhnovskyi. The bell tower was also built.

On 14 October 1905, on the feast of the Intercession of the Blessed Virgin, the church was consecrated by the Bishop of Stanyslaviv of the UGCC, Hryhoriy Khomyshyn.

In 1908, a wooden chapel of the Mother of God was built over the spring, which had previously appeared in the churchyard, and in three years a new brick chapel appeared on the site of the wooden one.

In 1996, a 40-meter-high bell tower was built next to the church. In May 1998, the parish was visited by Demetrius, Patriarch of the Ukrainian Church.

In the summer of 2001, a new spring, called the All-Queen's Spring, was built near the chapel, and on 11 August 2002, the Archbishop's consecration of the All-Queen's Spring took place by the UAOC Primate, Methodius a huge community of believers. On 24 August 2004, an image of the Mother of God covered with an omophorion appeared above the chapel. Every year on 11 August, a holiday is sent near the source of the All-Queen.

11 September 2009, the parish was visited by Patriarch of Kyiv and All Rus-Ukraine, Filaret. On 3 and 4 September 2025, Metropolitan Epiphanius of Kyiv and All Ukraine visited the parish.

== Abbots ==
- at. Emiliian Rostkovych
- at. Zenon Dudynskyi
- at. Illia Klyvak
- at. Oleksii Hunovskyi
- at. M. Chernykh
- at. Petro Dudynskyi (1905—1911)
- at. T. Chubatyi
- at. L. Dzoba
- at. R. Dobrianskyi
- at. M. Babii
- at. D. Panevyk
- at. Marko Dyrda
- at. Yakiv Tymchuk
- at. Y. Bachynskyi
- at. S. Poturniak
- at. V. Myshkovskyi
- at. Methodius Kudriakov
- at. Mykhailo Levkovych (since 1989)
- at. Andrii Levkovych (since 2010)

== Sources ==
- (in Ukrainian) Погорецький В., Федечко М., Чорпіта, Я., Чортків // Ternopil Oblast. History of cities and villages: in 3 v. / Ternopil: "Terno-graph", 2014, V. 3: М—Ш, S. 434–442. — ISBN 978-966-457-246-7.
- Андрій Бондаренко (2010-04-27). "Храми міста Чорткова". RISU.
- Дмитро Полюхович (2015-06-18). "Чортківська святість". Збруч.
- "Історія чортківського храму Святої Покрови". Золота пектораль. 2021-10-14.
