= Mayor of Chortkiv =

The following is a list of mayors of the city of Chortkiv, Ukraine. It includes positions equivalent to mayor, such as chairperson of the city council executive committee.

== Mayors ==
=== Austrian period ===
- Leon Chekonsky, 1868-1870
- Johann Shattauer, 1870-1871
- Alfred Doshot, 1871-1874
- Anton Chachkovsky, 1875-1877
- Gersh Rosenzweit, 1878-1882
- Ludwig Noss, 1883, 1888-1913
- Ferdinand Klodnytsky, 1884-1887
- Isaac Mozler, 1913-1914
- Isidore Kozover, 1914
- Evstahiy Dudrovych, 1914-1917
- Isaac Mozler, 1917-1918

=== West Ukrainian People's Republic ===
- Nicephorus Danish, 1918-1919

=== Second Polish Republic ===
- Ignat Lisakovsky, 1920
- Ivan Tymkiv, 1921
- Adam Fedorovich-Yatskovsky, 1928-1929
- Golinsky, 1930-1933
- Jerzy Sylwester Muszyński, 1934-1937
- Stanislav Severin Mikhalovsky, 1926-1937
- Jan Kachkowski, 1937
- Jan Plachta, 1937

=== Third Reich ===
- Julius Haas, 1942
- Gerhard Litschwager, 1941-1942
- Hans Kuyat, 1942-1944

=== USSR ===
- Gregory Cheverda, 1944
- B. Zinenko, 1944
- Gregory Urasov, 1944-1945
- I. Kirichenko, 1945
- Boris Good, 1945-1946
- Ivan Sidorenko, 1946-1947
- Hilarion Pavlenko, 1947-1948
- Ivan Abramov, 1948
- Vasil Pasechko, 1948-1950
- Alexander Melnichuk, 1950-1951
- Ivan Samusev, 1951-1952
- A. Schlichok, 1952
- Solomon Glaser, 1952
- Lubomir Kuzyak, 1952-1955
- Dmitry Shapovalov, 1955-1958
- Catherine of Dovhopol, 1958-1959
- Alexander Busarov, 1959-1962
- Mykola Babenko, 1962-1965
- Alexander Busarov, 1965-1967
- Andriy Kagadiy, July 1966 – 1967
- Theodosius Ranchakowski, 1967-1971
- Yaroslav Smagliy, 1971-1974
- Vladimir Berezhnov, 1974-1977
- Omelyan Reshetar, 1977-1982
- Stepan Demyanchuk, 1982-1987
- Mikhail Verbitsky, 1987-1990, 2001-2006, 2010–2015

=== Ukraine ===
- Bogdan Grechin, 1990-1997
- Yaroslav Stets, 1997-1998
- Vladimir Pavlishin, 1998-2000
- Maria Kuzyk, 2000-2001
- Igor Bilytsia, 2006-2010
- Vladimir Shmatko, 2015-

== See also ==
- Chortkiv history
- Chronology of Chortkiv (in Ukrainian)
- Chortkiv City Hall (in Ukrainian)
