= Anna Blazhenko =

Ukrainian journalist

- Анна Петрівна Блаженко
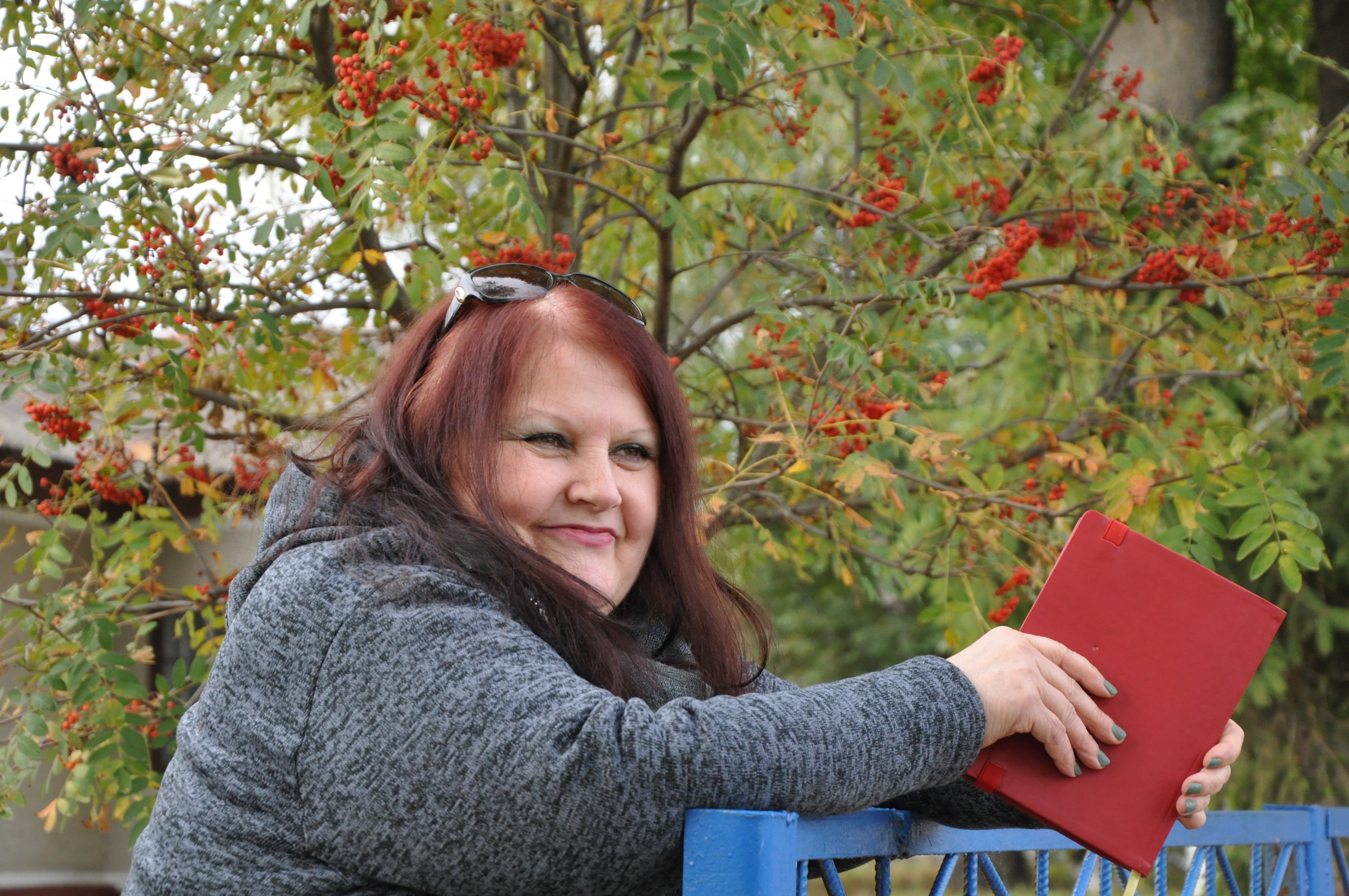
- Born: August 13, 1955 (age 71); Chortkiv, Ukraine
- Education: University of Lviv

Anna Petrivna Blazhenko (Ukrainian: Анна Петрівна Блаженко, born August 13, 1955 in Chortkiv, Ukraine) is a Ukrainian journalist. She is a member of the National Union of Journalists of Ukraine (1986) and the Chortkiv branch of the Union of Ukrainian Women (1989).

== Biography ==
Blazhenko became interested in journalism at the age of fifteen. During her school years she was actively published in the district newspaper Zoria Komunizmu and in the regional youth newspaper Rovesnyk. She studied at the school of public correspondents at the district newspaper.

Blazhenko graduated from the Faculty of Journalism of University of Lviv in 1980. She worked as a librarian at the Chortkiv Central Library System after graduation. In September 17, 1984, Blazhenko worked as a correspondent at the district newspaper Holos narodu. She would later become head of the department of letters and mass work of the editorial office and became the deputy editor from 2014 of the newspaper.

Blazhenko was the executive secretary of the district organization of the National Union of Journalists of Ukraine (1992–2007).

Blazhenko heads the district's primary journalistic organization.

== Art ==
Published in the regional press, literary and artistic and public journalism magazine "Zolota pektoral" (2007–2008), in the literary almanac "Soniachne hrono".

Compiler and co-author of the brochure of local lore "Under the Sign of Grace" (2005), historical and tourist guide "Chortkivshchyna" (2007).

== Awards ==
- Gold Medal of Ukrainian Journalism (2013)
- Winner of the district award "Victory-2017" in the nomination "Best Journalist of the Year" (2018)
- Honored Journalist of Ukraine (2018)
- Golden Feather of Ternopil (2018)

== Sources ==
Погорецький, В. Чортків у постатях. Анна Блаженко // Світло і тіні чортківських замків (Сторінками історії міста (XI-XVIII ст.) Книга перша / П. С. Федоришин. — Тернопіль : Терно-граф, 2019. — С. 739. — ISBN 978-966-457-355-6.

== Link ==
- Anna Blazhenko on Facebook
- Погорецький В. Журналіст від Бога. Штрихи до творчого портрета Анни Блаженко з Чорткова // Золота Пектораль. — 2013. — 18 квітня.
