= Chortkiv Castle =

- Chortkiv, Ternopil Oblast
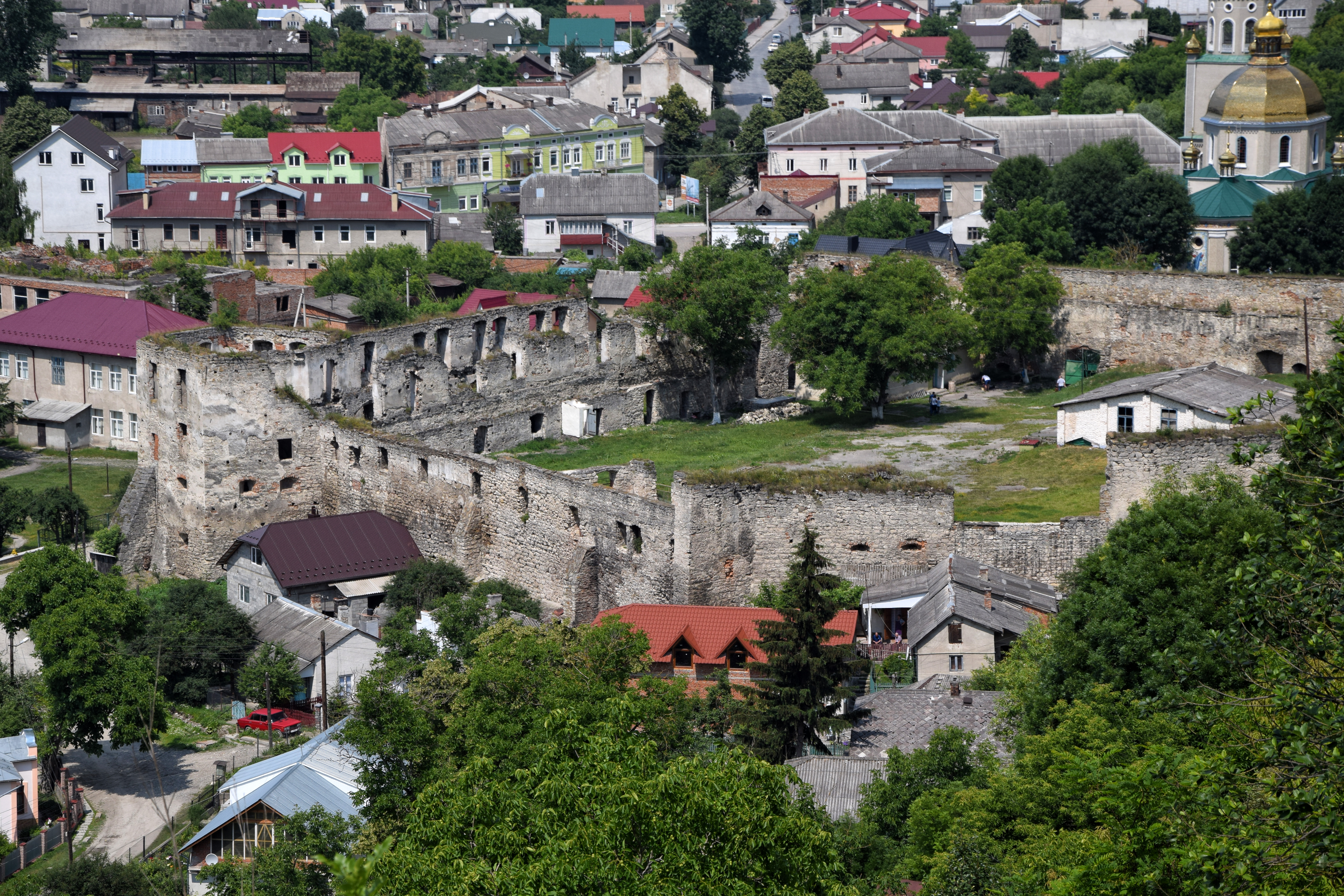

Site information
- Owner: Ukrainian State
- Condition: continuous renovations

Location
- Coordinates: 49°01′17″N 25°48′09″E

Site history
- Events: Tatar invasions, Russian Revolution, World War II

Immovable Monument of National Significance of Ukraine
- Official name: Замок (Castle)
- Type: Architecture
- Reference no.: 190020

The Chortkiv Castle (Ukrainian: Чортківський замок, romanized: Chortkivs'kyi zamok) is a brick castle built in the early 17th century on the left bank of the river Seret in Vyhnanka on the site of a previous wooden castle in the mid-16th century. Now it is located in Chortkiv.

== History ==
The initiator of the construction of the residence was Stanisław Golski. In 1612, after the death of Stanisław Golski, the castle became the property of his brother, Jan Golski, a castellan from Kamenets, and in 1618 - his widow, Zofia of Zamechów Golski, in exchange for renouncing her claims. The castle and the city were handed over to Stefan Potocki, in whose family the castle was located for over 100 years.

The castle was built of stone and brick in the wrong plan with three towers, one of which is no longer today. Inside the perimeter stood the palace of the owners. Defensive ramparts went west from the castle, at the end of which, near the railway station, the ruins of another building are mentioned. According to legend, the underground dungeons were to stretch from the castle under the river to Bilche-Zolote in the area of Borshchiv. The castle was defended many times during numerous Tatar raids and was not conquered by them.

In 1655, during the Polish-Russian War, after several days of defense under the leadership of Voivode Piotr Potocki, the castle was captured by Cossack-Moscow troops marching on Lviv. In 1670 the castle was besieged by the Turks. After the capture in 1672, it was the residence of the Turkish bashes until 1683, after which it was recaptured by the Polish army under Hetman Andrzej Potocki. Jan III Sobieski soon came to the castle.

In the 18th century, the south-west wing was rebuilt, turning the towers into ledges and building an observation deck. In 1750 the castle passed from the hands of the Potocki family to the Wrublewski family, and then to the Sadowski family, who placed it there after 1809, tobacco warehouse, and then leased it to the Austrian authorities. After 1815, a municipal arrest was organized there, and in 1863 the Austrians imprisoned the January rebels interned in Galicia.

The last owner, Jerome Sadowski, who died in 1895, donated all his property, including the castle, to charity. Since then, the castle has housed a shelter for the elderly and disabled, as well as a school for children. All were taken care of by the Congregation of the Sisters of Mercy of St. Wincentego à Paulo (Daughters of Mercy) from Staryi Chortkiv. The castle, which had not been repaired, was destroyed. After partial dismantling, the roof collapsed. In the rooms that were not destroyed, there were still merchant warehouses. In 1937 the castle was bought by the Polish Tourist and Excursion Society, which partially renovated the castle tower and turned it into a tourist shelter, a photo room and a museum of local lore. After the Second World War and the annexation of the city to the USSR (1945), a transport base was built nearby, and the castle itself, unprotected and unused, was subject to further degradation, which continues to this day. Currently, the castle belongs to the Castles of Ternopil Oblast National Reserve.

== Architecture ==
At first there was a wooden fortress, but it did not provide enough security. So they built a new one of stone and brick. It had a two-story apartment building, three towers and strong defensive walls with numerous arrowheads. To the west were also defensive ramparts, at the end of which was an old castle, of which only fragments remain. Probably, the dungeons of the castle stretched under the river to the village of Bilche-Zolote.

== Sources ==
- Aftanazy Roman, Dzieje rezydencji na dawnych kresach Rzeczypospolitej. Województwo ruskie, Ziemia Halicka i Lwowska, T. 7, wyd. 2 przejrzane i uzupełnione, Zakład Narodowy im. Ossolińskich, Wrocław, Warszawa, 1995, ISBN 83-04-03701-7 całość, ISBN 83-04-04229-0 t. 7, ss. 52-54,
- Filip Sulimierski, Bronisław Chlebowski, Władysław Walewski, Słownik geograficzny Królestwa Polskiego i innych krajów słowiańskich, t. XIV, Warszawa, 1880–1902, ss. 84-85
- D. Frankel, Dzieje zamku czortkowskiego, "Podole" nr 63, 1930
- Aleksander Czołowski, Przeszłość i zabytki województwa tarnopolskiego, Tarnopol 1926, s.73

== Link ==
- "Wygnanka 4.) W., wś, pow. czortkowski". Geographical Dictionary of the Kingdom of Poland (in Polish). 14. Warszawa: Kasa im. Józefa Mianowskiego. 1895. p. 83.
- Opis zamku w j. ukraińskim
- Zamek w Wygnance
- Archiwalne widoki zamku w bibliotece Polona
