= Church of the Dormition in Chortkiv =

Church in Ternopil Oblast, Ukraine

Church of the Dormition, Chortkiv Церква Успіння Пресвятої Богородиці
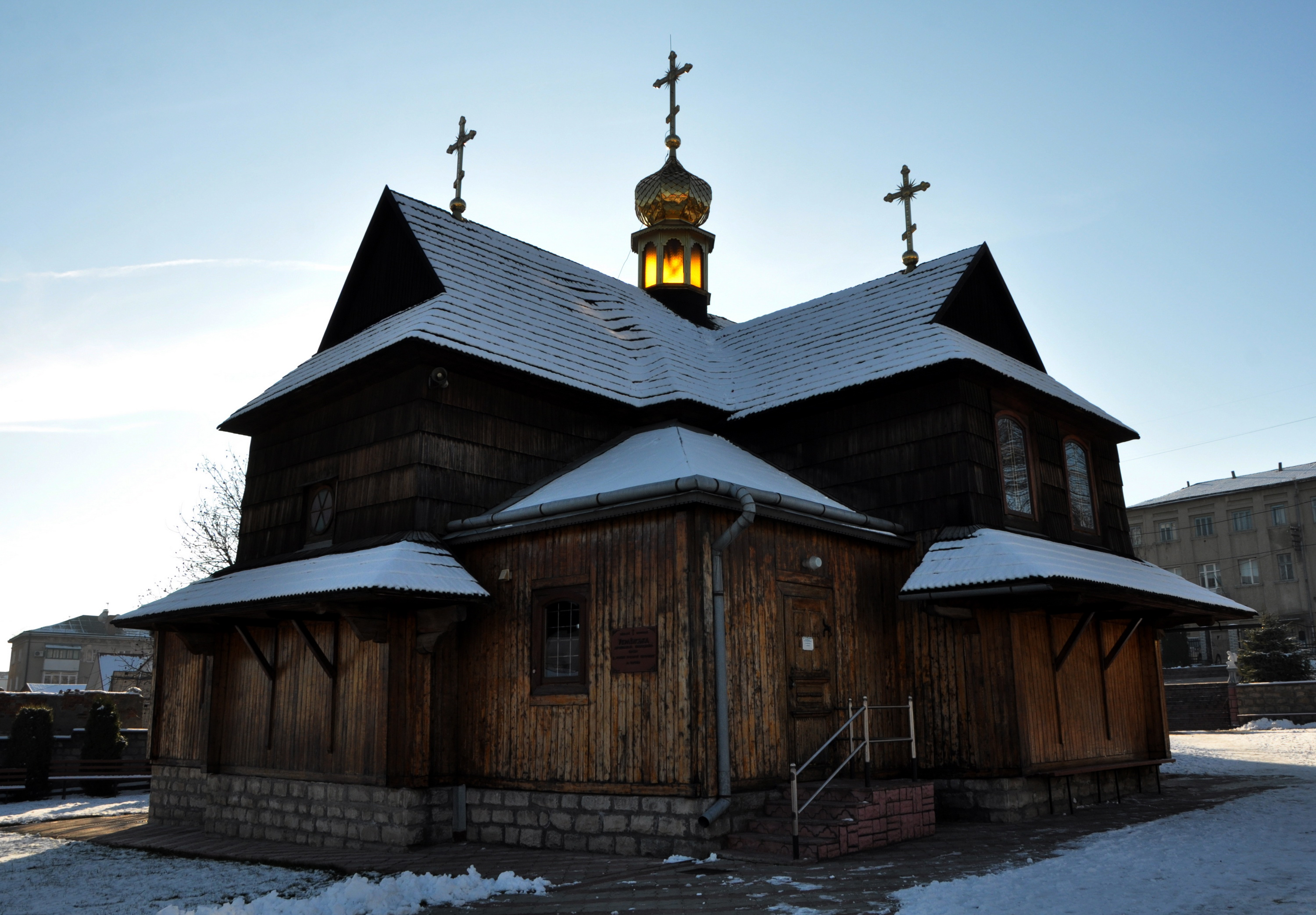

- Location within Ternopil Oblast

Religion
- Affiliation: Orthodox Church of Ukraine

Location
- Location: Chortkiv
- Coordinates: 49°01′02″N 25°47′42″E

Immovable Monument of National Significance of Ukraine
- Official name: Успенська церква (дер.) (Dormition Church (wooden))
- Type: Architecture
- Reference no.: 190068

Church of the Dormition (Ukrainian: Церква Успіння Пресвятої Богородиці) is an Orthodox parish church of the Orthodox Church of Ukraine in Chortkiv of the Chortkiv urban hromada of the Chortkiv Raion of the Ternopil Oblast. The church and its bell tower have been designated as an architectural monument of national significance.

== History ==
Dating back to the 16th century, this church is considered one of the oldest wooden religious buildings in Podolia. The temple, which features a three-part structure with a gable roof, was consecrated in 1583 in honor of the Dormition of the Blessed Virgin Mary.

Throughout the years, the church suffered significant damage from Turkish and Tatar invasions, but local parishioners always rebuilt it. Following Ukraine's independence, the church underwent a full restoration.

On 28 August 2003, the community celebrated the church's 420th anniversary. The current rector of the church is Myron Karach.
