= Skorodyntsi =

Rural locality in Ternopil Oblast, Ukraine

Skorodyntsi Скородинці
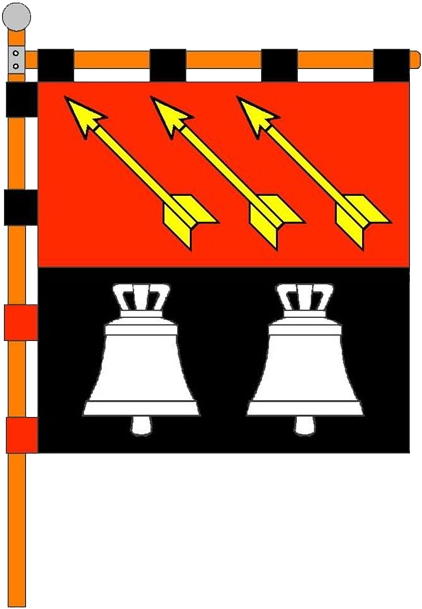
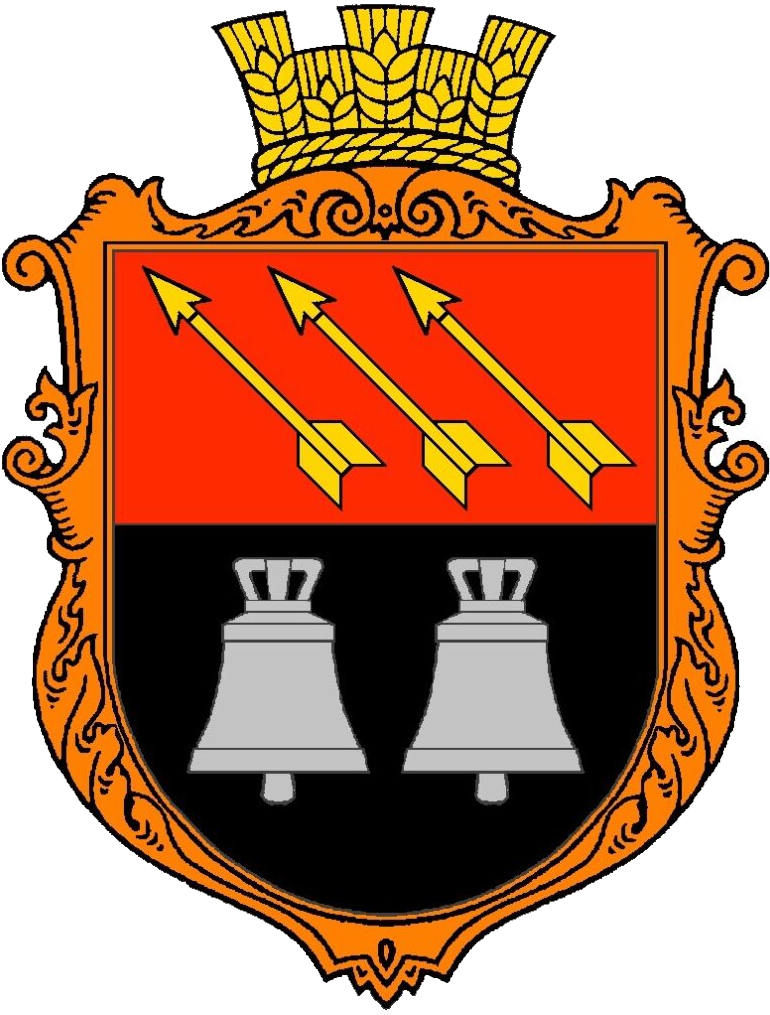
- Flag Coat of arms

- Location in Ternopil Oblast
- Coordinates: 49°4′40″N 25°44′44″E
- Country: Ukraine
- Oblast: Ternopil Oblast
- Raion: Chortkiv Raion
- Hromada: Chortkiv Hromada
- Time zone: UTC+2 (EET)
  - Summer (DST): UTC+3 (EEST)
- Postal code: 48513

Skorodyntsi (Ukrainian: Скородинці) is a village in Ukraine, Ternopil Oblast, Chortkiv Raion, Chortkiv urban hromada.

== History ==
Known since 1568 as Skovrodyntsi.

== Religion ==
- Church of the Assumption (OCU, 1914, built in stone)
- Church of the Assumption (UGCC, 2012, former RCC church, 1910)
