= Korczyna =

Korczyna may refer to the following places in Poland:

- Korczyna, Lesser Poland Voivodeship
- Korczyna, Podkarpackie Voivodeship
- Gmina Korczyna, Krosno County, Subcarpathian Voivodeship

== See also ==
- Korczyn, Kielce County, Świętokrzyskie Voivodeship
