= Pastushe =

Rural locality in Ternopil Oblast, Ukraine

Pastushe Пастуше
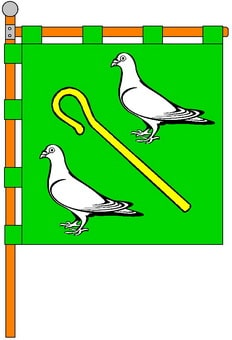
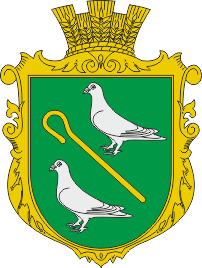
- Flag Coat of arms

- Location in Ternopil Oblast
- Coordinates: 49°1′5″N 25°52′7″E
- Country: Ukraine
- Oblast: Ternopil Oblast
- Raion: Chortkiv Raion
- Hromada: Chortkiv Hromada
- Time zone: UTC+2 (EET)
  - Summer (DST): UTC+3 (EEST)
- Postal code: 48503

Pastushe (Ukrainian: Пастуше) is a village in Ukraine, Ternopil Oblast, Chortkiv Raion, Chortkiv urban hromada.

== History ==
The first written mention is dated 1581.

== Religion ==
- Church of John the Baptist (2010, brick, OCU)
