= Volodymyr Zabolotnyi (priest) =

Ukrainian actor, public and religious figure (born 1960)

- Володимир Заболотний
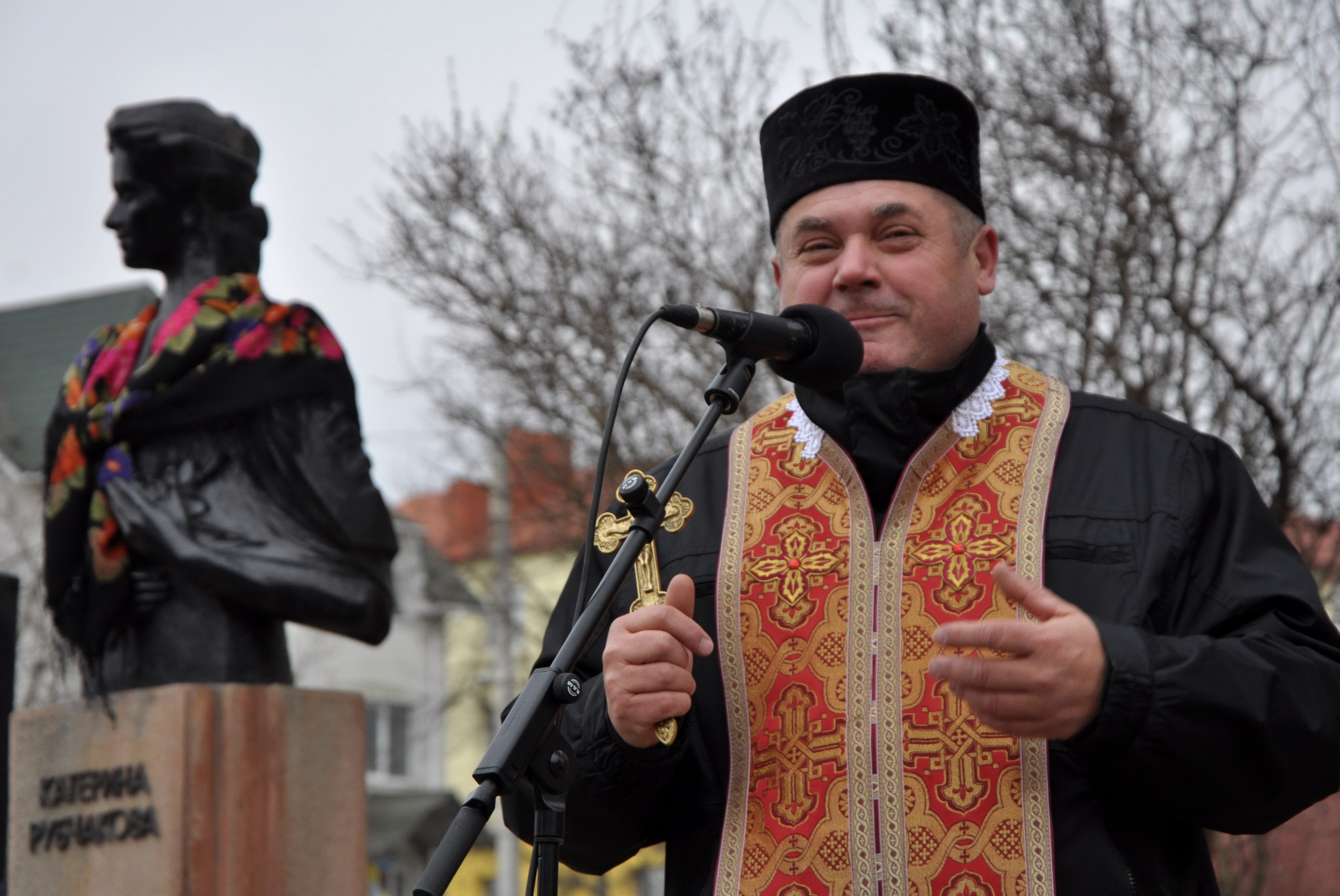
- о. Volodymyr Zabolotnyi during the commemoration of the 100th anniversary of the death of Kateryna Rubchakova in Chortkiv
- Born: Volodymyr Volodymyrovych Zabolotnyi; 15 September 1960 (age 65); Chortkiv, Ternopil Oblast
- Education: Solomiia Krushelnytska Ternopil Music College, Ivano-Frankivsk Theological Catechetical Institute

Volodymyr Volodymyrovych Zabolotnyi (Ukrainian: Володимир Володимирович Заболотний; born 15 September 1960, Chortkiv, Ternopil Oblast) is a Ukrainian actor, public and religious figure, and mitred priest (2023). He was a member of the Ternopil City Council (1990).

== Early life ==
He is the son of Mariia Potykevych-Zabolotna. Zabolotnyi graduated from the Solomiia Krushelnytska Ternopil Music College (1983) and the Ivano-Frankivsk Theological Catechetical Institute (1996).

== Career ==
He worked as an actor and deputy director (until 1991) of the Ternopil Regional Music and Drama Theater.

In 1993 he was ordained. Zabolotnyi served in the parishes of the Ternopil Raion.

He was organizer (1998) and editor of the newspaper Blahovist of the Zalozetsky Deanery of the Ternopil Raion.

In 2007 he became a priest of the Buchach Eparchy of the Ukrainian Greek Catholic Church. He was responsible for the construction of the first church in Europe on the territory of a pre-trial detention center.

In December 2019, he became an advisor to the Pastoral Council of the Patriarchal Curia of the UGCC.

He is active in the editorial board of the publication Buchach Diocese of the UGCC. Parishes, monasteries, temples. Shematism.

He was a member of the jury of the second festival of sacred music choirs of the Buchach Diocese of the UGCC "God, Save Ukraine" (2019).

== Awards ==
- Badge "Pride of Ternopil" (11 July 2018)
- Diploma of the Verkhovna Rada of Ukraine (21 December 2018)

== Sources ==
- (in Ukrainian) Погорецький В., Федечко М., Чорпіта, Я., Чортків // Ternopil Oblast. History of cities and villages: in 3 v. / Ternopil: "Terno-graph", 2014, V. 3: М—Ш, S. 434—442. — ISBN 978-966-457-246-7.
