= Chortkiv urban hromada =

Urban hromada in Ternopil Oblast, Ukraine

Chortkiv urban hromada Чортківська міська громада
- Hromada
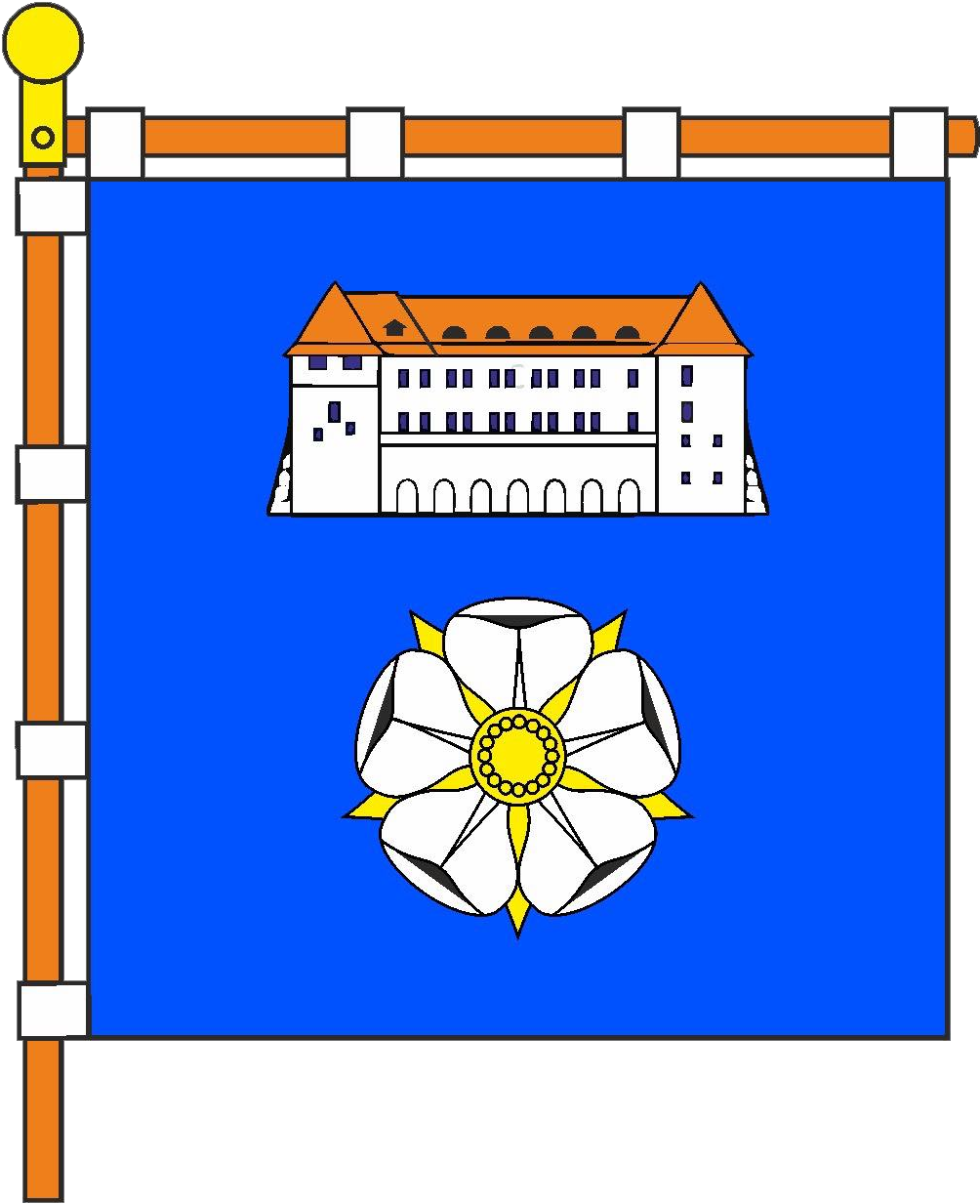
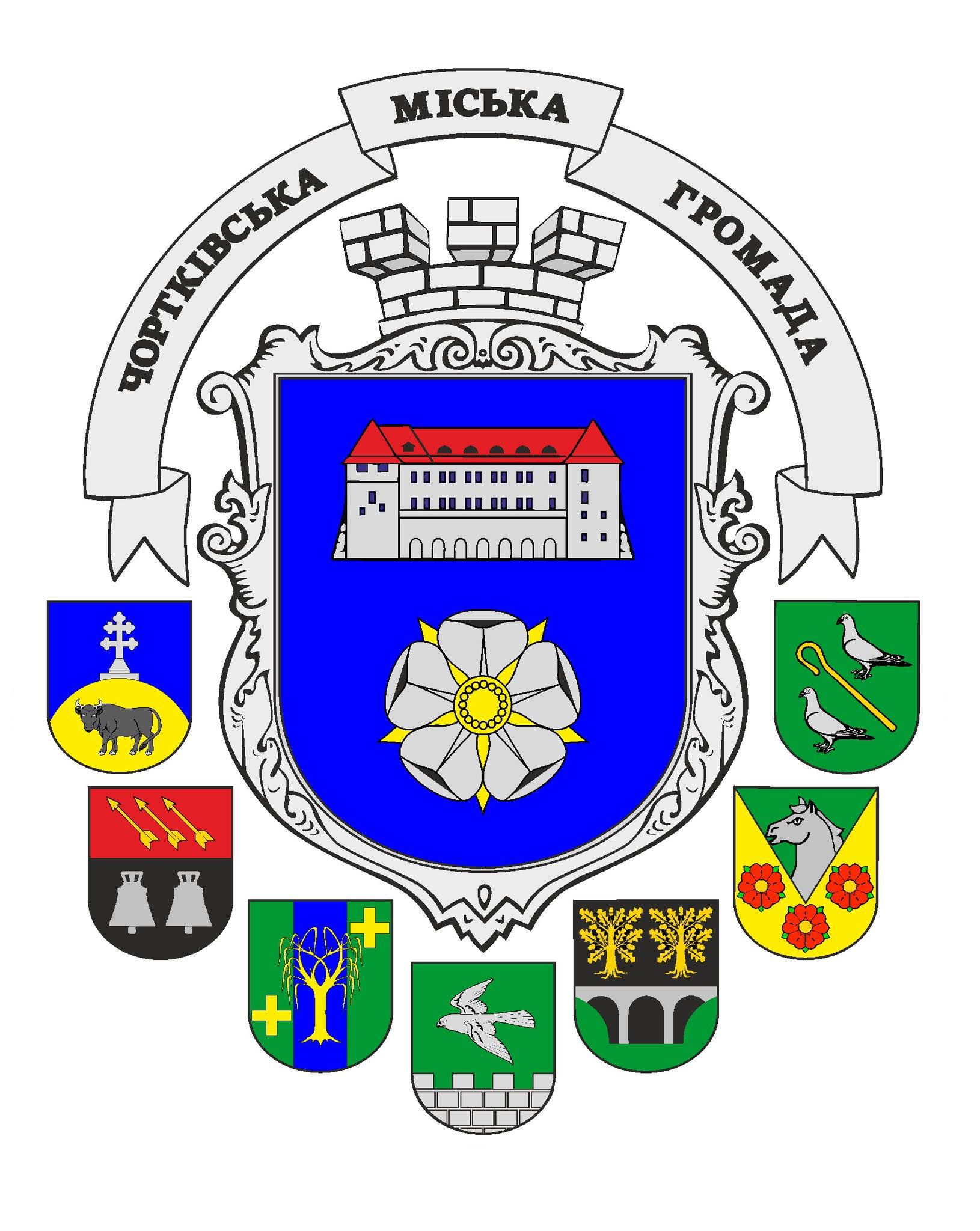
- Flag Seal

- Location within Ternopil Oblast Location within Ukraine
- Coordinates: 49°00′27″N 25°47′26″E
- Country: Ukraine
- Oblast (province): Ternopil Oblast
- Raion (district): Chortkiv Raion

Area
  - Total: 127.5 km^{2} (49.2 sq mi)

Population (2023)
  - Total: 36,632

Chortkiv urban territorial hromada (Ukrainian: Чортківська міська територіальна громада, romanized: Chortkivska miska terytorialna hromada) is a hromada (municipality) in Ternopil Oblast in western Ukraine. Its administrative centre is the city of Chortkiv.

Chortkiv urban hromada has a territory of 127.5 square kilometres (49.2 mi^{2}), as well as a population of 36,632 (As of 2023).

== Settlements ==
In addition to one city (Chortkiv), the hromada includes seven villages:

- Bychkivtsi
- Bila
- Horishnia Vyhnanka
- Pastushe
- Perekhody
- Rosokhach
- Skorodyntsi
