= St. George Orthodox Church =

St. George Orthodox Church may refer to the following churches:

== India ==
- St. George Orthodox Church, Chandanapally, Kerala
- St. George Orthodox Church, Cheppad, Kerala
- St. George Orthodox Church, Chungathara, Kerala
- St. George Orthodox Church, Mylapra, Kerala
- St. George Orthodox Church, Puthuppally, Kerala
- St. George Orthodox Koonan Kurishu Old Syrian Church, Kochi, Kerala

== United States ==
- St. George the Great Martyr Orthodox Church, St. George Island, Alaska
- St. George's Greek Orthodox Church (Southbridge, Massachusetts)
- St. George Coptic Orthodox Church (Brooklyn), New York
- St. George Coptic Orthodox Church (Philadelphia), Pennsylvania

== Elsewhere ==
- St George Macedonian Orthodox Church, Fitzroy, Melbourne, Australia
- Church of Saint George (Lod), Israel
- St. George Greek Orthodox Church, Asmara, Eritrea
- Saint George Greek Orthodox Cathedral, Beirut, Lebanon
- Greek Orthodox Cathedral of St George, Cape Town, South Africa
- Saint George church, Shmankivchyky (Orthodox Church of Ukraine), Chortkiv, Ternopil, Ukraine

== See also ==
- Greek Orthodox Church of St. George (disambiguation)
- St. George Antiochian Orthodox Church (disambiguation)
- St George's Church (disambiguation)
