= List of Greek Orthodox churches in the United States =

This is a list of Greek Orthodox churches in the United States that are notable, either as buildings or as church congregations. Some are buildings that are listed on the National Register of Historic Places or state- or local historic register for their architecture or other reasons. Some are former church buildings; others are current churches within the Greek Orthodox Archdiocese of America.

These are Orthodox Christian cathedrals or churches in North America that are notable, whether for their architectural design and or historical characteristics or for other reasons.

These are: (by state then city)

Name	Images	Location	Jurisdiction	Dates	Note
Greek Orthodox Church of the Assumption		9th and Castro Sts., Oakland, California; 37°48′15″N 122°16′43″W		1920 built 1978 NRHP-listed	Designed by Charles Burrell, Beaux-Arts-style
Holy Trinity Greek Orthodox Church		900 6th St. Sioux City, Iowa; 42°29′46″N 96°23′55″W		1918 founded 1926 built 1998 NRHP-listed	Designed by William L. Steele
Saint Athanasius Greek Orthodox Church		Arlington, Massachusetts; 42°24′59″N 71°9′27″W		1841 built 1985 NRHP-listed	Romanesque-style church included in Arlington Center Historic District. Built in 1841 for a Universalist congregation. Served as Saint Athasius Greek Orthodox Church during 1964–2004. Now known as Highrock Church, home to an Evangelical Covenant Church congregation.
St. John the Baptist Greek Orthodox Church		602 Park Avenue; Omaha, Nebraska; 41°15′14″N 95°57′22″W	Greek Orthodox Archdiocese of America	1907 founded 1908 built 1951 purchased 1958 dedicated	Building designed by architect John Latenser Sr. in Byzantine style to serve Omaha's Temple Israel. Sold to St. John's parish in 1951. Listed as an Omaha city landmark.
Greek Orthodox Church of St. George		Piscataway, New Jersey			
St. Nicholas Greek Orthodox Church		Manhattan, New York	Greek Orthodox Archdiocese of America	2014 construction started 2022 opened	
Annunciation Greek Orthodox Church		Wauwatosa, Wisconsin	Greek Orthodox Archdiocese of America	1959 built	
Holy Trinity Cathedral		279 S. 200 West, Salt Lake City; 40°45′47″N 111°53′57″W	1923 built 1975 NRHP-listed		Byzantine architecture. Listed on the NRHP as Holy Trinity Greek Orthodox Church

Also by state and then city:

- Holy Trinity Greek Orthodox Church (San Francisco)
- St. John's Greek Orthodox Church, Pueblo, Colorado, NRHP-listed
- Saint Sophia Cathedral (Washington, D.C.)
- St. Nicholas Greek Orthodox Cathedral (Tarpon Springs, Florida)
- Annunciation Greek Orthodox Cathedral (Atlanta), Georgia
- Greek Orthodox Church of Saint George, Des Moines, Iowa, NRHP-listed
- Annunciation Greek Orthodox Cathedral of New England, Boston, MA, NRHP-listed
- Holy Trinity Greek Orthodox Church (Lowell, Massachusetts), NRHP-listed
- Assumption Greek Orthodox Church, University City, MO, NRHP-listed
- St. George's Greek Orthodox Church, Southbridge, MA, NRHP-listed
- St. Euphrosynia Belarusian Orthodox Church, New Jersey
- Archdiocesan Cathedral of the Holy Trinity, New York City
- St. Spyridon Greek Orthodox Church, New York
- All Saints Antiochian Orthodox Church, Raleigh, North Carolina
- Holy Trinity Greek Orthodox Cathedral (Charlotte, North Carolina)
- Holy Trinity Ukrainian Greek Orthodox Church, Wilton, ND, NRHP-listed
- Holy Trinity Greek Orthodox Church, Steubenville, Ohio, listed on the NRHP in Jefferson County, Ohio
- Holy Trinity Greek Orthodox Church (Tulsa, Oklahoma)
- Greek Orthodox Church of the Holy Trinity, Charleston, SC, NRHP-listed
- Annunciation Greek Orthodox Cathedral (Houston), Texas
- Holy Trinity Greek Orthodox Cathedral (Phoenix, Arizona)
