= Greek Orthodox Church of St. George =

Greek Orthodox Church of St. George may refer to:

- Community and Parish of Saint George Thebarton, Adelaide, South Australia
- St. George Greek Orthodox Church, Asmara, Eritrea
- Greek Orthodox Church of St. George (Des Moines, Iowa), United States
- Greek Orthodox Church of St. George (Piscataway, New Jersey), United States
