= Saint George Church, Shmankivchyky (Greek Catholic) =

Church in Ternopil Oblast, Ukraine

Saint George Church
- Церква святого Юрія
- Location within Ternopil Oblast

Religion
- Affiliation: Ukrainian Greek Catholic Church

Location
- Location: Shmankivchyky
- Interactive map of Saint George Church
- Coordinates: 48°58′30″N 25°54′37″E

Saint George Church (Ukrainian: Церква святого Юрія) Greek Catholic Parish Church (UGCC) in Shmankivchyky of the Zavodske settlement hromada of the Chortkiv Raion of the Ternopil Oblast.

== History ==
The Greek Catholic community of Shmankivchyky was officially registered on 24 July 1991. The construction of a chapel began the following spring and was consecrated in May on Mother's Day by Father Bohdan Nedilskyi.

On 18 March 2012, the cornerstone for a new church was consecrated, beginning a new construction project initiated by Father Ivan Senkiv. The church's cross was blessed on Palm Sunday in 2014 by Father Roman Lytvyniv.

Construction of the church was completed in 2018. On May 6 of that year, Bishop Dmytro Hryhorak of the Buchach Eparchy performed the consecration during the church's patronal feast. The Pope's Worldwide Prayer Network brotherhood is an active part of the parish. In addition, the village has a liturgical chapel dedicated to St. George, which was also built in 1992.

== Abbots ==
- at. Bogdan Nedilskyi (1992–2000)
- at. Bohdan Shkilnytskyi (2000–2005)
- at. Zenovii Pasichnyk
- at. Serhii Lishchynskyi (2005–2006)
- at. Ivan Senkiv (2006–2013)
- at. Roman Lytvyniv has been the parish administrator since September 2013

== Sources ==
- Парафія с. Шманьківчики. Церква святого Юрія // Бучацька єпархія УГКЦ. Парафії, монастирі, храми. Шематизм / Автор концепції Куневич Б.; керівник проекту, науковий редактор Стоцький Я. — Тернопіль : ТОВ «Новий колір», 2014. — С. 305. : іл. — ISBN 978-966-2061-30-7.
