= Shmankivchyky =

Shmankivchyky Шманьківчики
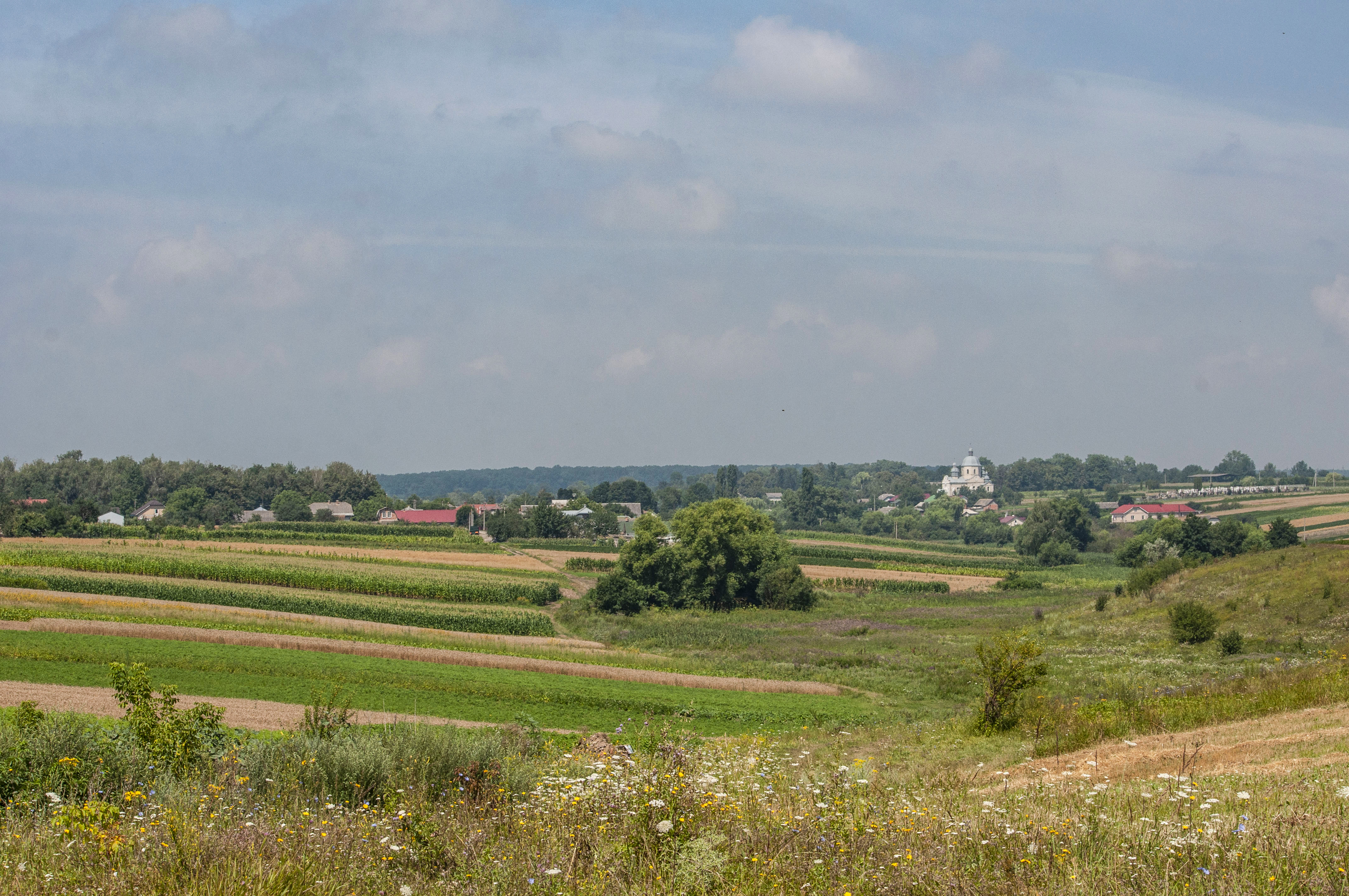

- Location in Ternopil Oblast Shmankivchyky (Ukraine)
- Coordinates: 48°58′28″N 25°54′43″E
- Country: Ukraine
- Oblast: Ternopil Oblast
- Raion: Chortkiv Raion
- Hromada: Zavodske Hromada

Population (2021)
  - Total: 912
- Time zone: UTC+2 (EET)
  - Summer (DST): UTC+3 (EEST)
- Postal code: 48551

Shmankivchyky village in Ukraine, Ternopil Oblast, Chortkiv Raion, Zavodske settlement hromada. Administrative center of the former Shmankivchyky village council.

== Geography ==
Located 12 km from the district center and 2.5 km from the eponymous railway station.

=== Terrain ===
- The Canal is a hamlet located 0.3 km from the village. In 1952, the farm had 4 yards and 11 inhabitants.

== Toponymy ==
Part of the population of Shmankivtsi settled near the forest and the old broken road that led to Skala and Kamianets. The new settlement also received a consonant name, the name of which came from Shmankivtsi. Mykhailo Khudash stated this, noting that his name means "those who moved from the village of Shmankivtsi".

Mykola Krykun gives the following variants of the names of the village. Shmankivchiki recorded in chronological order in the relevant sources:

- Szmankowce Stare alias Małe alias Podleśne, s. - Kamenets Zemstvo Book 1610;
- Szmankowce, s. - Kamyanets Zemstvo Book 1617, 1642;
- Szmankowce, s. - Lifting register 1629, 1650 1661, 1667;
- Szmankowce, s. - General Register 1662;
- §Imankofije-i Maleńki, p. - Kamenets defter 1681.

== History ==
Known since the XVII century. For the first time it appears in documents for 1610 under the name Shmankivtsi Old or Small or Undergrowth, in 1678 it is Shmankivchi.

In 1785, 494 people lived in the village. The palace of Stanislaw Wygowski is still preserved. It is known that in the eastern part of Shmankivchyky there were estates of oo. Dominicans from Chortkiv, who together with the forest owned 600 mortuaries of land. The peasants owned 400 morgues.

In 1880 there were 69 houses in Shmankivchyky (60 - in the village, 9 - on the territory of the estate), in which 464 people lived. In 1900 - 741 inhabitants, 1910 - 754, 1921 - 710, 1931 - 760; in 1921. - 133, 1931 - 169 yards.

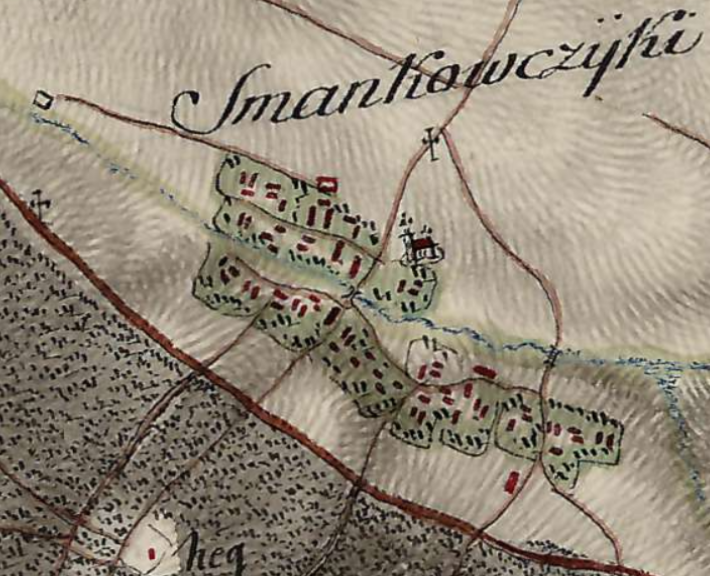
Shmankivchyky on the map of von Mig, XVIII century.

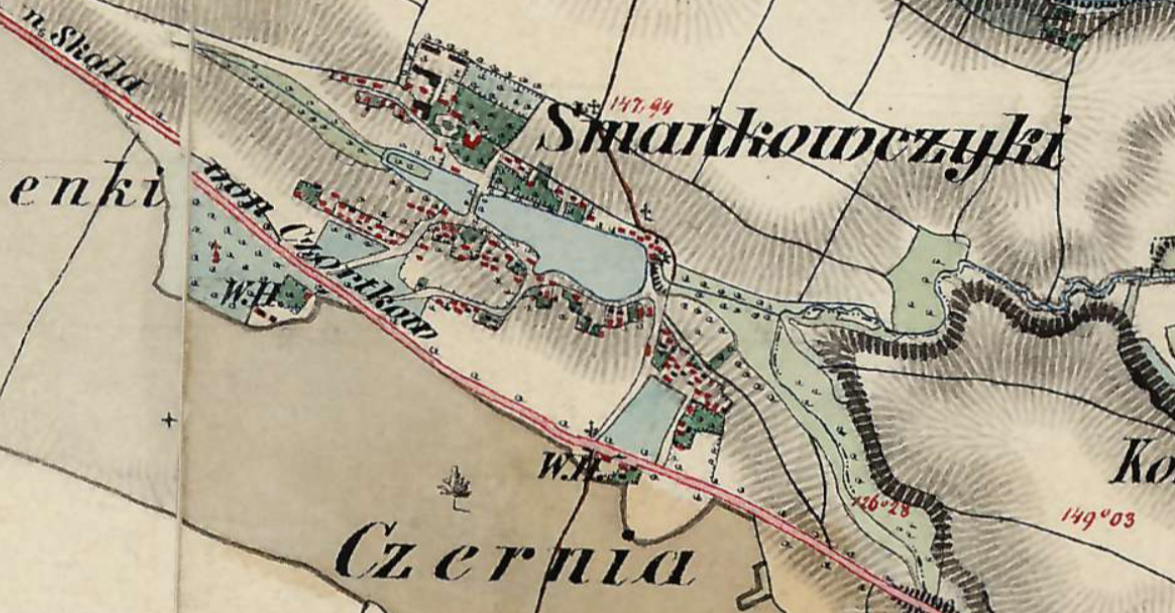
Shmankivchyky on the Austrian topographic map, 1861-1864.

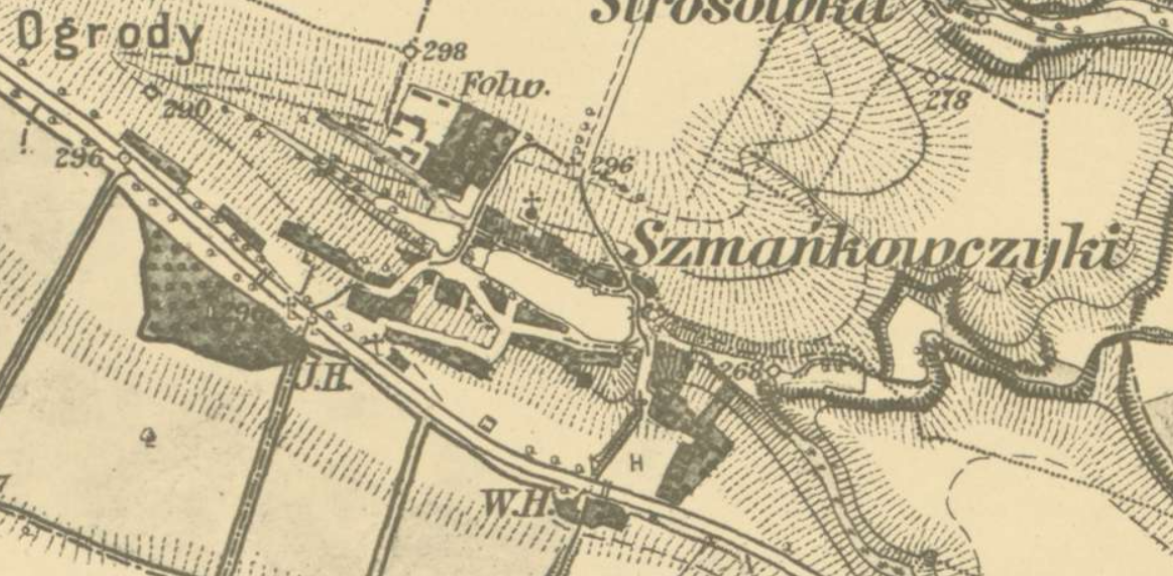
Shmankivchyky on the Austrian topographic map, 1869-1887.

In Austria-Hungary there was a 1-grade school, in Poland - a 2-grade school (both with Polish language of instruction), which were located in the house. In 1872 the villagers built a chapel, in 1912 - a school, in 1927 - a reading room. There was a distillery, a mill, a brickyard, and an inn.

During the 1920's and 1930's, there were branches of the Prosvita societies, Luh, Silskyi Hospodar, Ridna Shkola, and other cooperatives.

There were the Polish societies Kółko rolnicze, Związek Strzelecki and Dom ludowy.

For some time Shmankivchyky was the center of the commune of the same name. From August 1, 1934 to 1939, the village belonged to the Kolyndiany Gmaina.

On the eve of the Second World War (1938) a church was built from a spy to a filwark. Polish authorities arrested Vasyl A. and Vasyl T. Zakharchuk and imprisoned them in the Bereza Kartuzka concentration camp.

After the establishment of Soviet power in September 1939, Maksym Koziar was elected chairman of the village council. In the same year, the credit union was nationalized, and the Prosvita reading room was renamed the club. In 1941, the Zakharchuk and Fedir Kaluzhniak families were deported to Siberia. After the retreat of the Red Army in the same year, a grave was laid in the village and a cross was erected.

In 1939-1941, NKVD bodies tortured and shot Shmankivchyky residents Anton Barashovych, Myroslav Bodnaruk, and Ivan Horyachyi in the Chortkiv prison; On July 20–21, 1941, Ivan Hlukh, Petro Herman, Oleksa Horyachyi, Fedir Davydiuk, and Anton Slota were shot dead in Uman in the Cherkasy Oblast. Vasyl Bryhadyr, Vasyl Vilkhovyi, Myroslav Horyachyi, Anton and Olha Zakharchuk`s, Ivan and Rozalia Mostovych`s, Antin and Mykhailo Yurkiv and others fought in the UPA.

During the German-Soviet war, the Red Army died or went missing:

- Yulian Boiko (born 1912),
- Maksym Boianovskyi (born 1905),
- Maksym Verbovetskyi (born 1906),
- Vasyl Hyra (born 1918),
- Stepan Hlukh (born 1920),
- Anton (born 1897), Mykola (born 1903) and Yaroslav Zakharchuk`s (born 1921),
- Vasyl Klym, Vasyl Kuts (born 1904),
- Mykhailo Mishchii, Mykhailo Pyrozhyk (born 1906),
- Omelian Reshetii (born 1904),
- Vasyl (born 1912) and Mikhailo (born 1918) Stets,
- Mykola Ushii (born 1910),
- Vasyl Chudyk (born 1904).

Since November 27, 2020, Shmankivchyky belongs to the Factory Village Community. On November 12, 2021, the Shmankivchyky Starostynskyi District was formed.

On July 30, 2020, the first case of COVID-19 infection was registered in Shmankivchyky.

== Religion ==
- Saint George church (OCU; 1996)
- Saint George church (UGCC; 1992)

== Monuments ==
- The settlement of Shmankivchyky I (Trypillia culture; Early Iron Age) is a newly discovered object of cultural heritage, protection number 1870.
- a monument to fellow soldiers killed in the German-Soviet war (1968) - a historical monument of local significance, protection number 821;
- "Figure" of the Mother of God (1990)
- symbolic mound-grave of the Fighters for the Freedom of Ukraine (1991);
- a memorial cross in honor of the abolition of serfdom in Austria-Hungary (1848).

== Social sphere ==
The T 2001 Buchach-Chortkiv-Skala-Podilska highway passed through the village.

Until 2021, there was a library, which was reorganized into a studio of the Center for Cultural Services of the Factory Village Council.

There is a secondary school, kindergarten, library, medical and obstetric center, post office, OJSC "Chortkiv Breeding Enterprise" (former state breeding station), farm "Velychko", OJSC "Ternopil Regional Fish and Reclamation Station", Chortkiv Production trade enterprise "Rii", PE "Olha-LTD", three trade establishments.

== Sources ==
- (in Ukrainian) Бойко В., Уніят В., Федечко М., Шманьківчики // Ternopil Oblast. History of cities and villages: in 3 v. / Ternopil: "Terno-graph", 2014, V. 3: М—Ш, S. 523—524. — ISBN 978-966-457-246-7.
- (in Ukrainian) Мельничук Б., Чорпіта Я., Шманьківчики // Ternopil Encyclopedic Dictionary: in 4 v. / editorial board: H. Yavorskyi and other, Ternopil: "Zbruch", 2008, V. 3: П—Я, S. 645. — ISBN 978-966-528-279-2.
- (in Ukrainian) Шманьківчики // Чортківська округа. Історично-мемуарний збірник / ред. колегія О. Соневицької та інші. — Париж — Сидней — Торонто : НТШ, Український архів, 1974. — Т. XXVII. — P. 232—235. : іл.
- "Szmańkowczyki". Geographical Dictionary of the Kingdom of Poland (in Polish). 12. Warszawa: Kasa im. Józefa Mianowskiego. 1892. p. 7.
