= St. John's Greek Orthodox Church (Pueblo, Colorado) =

Historic church in Colorado, United States

- U.S. National Register of Historic Places
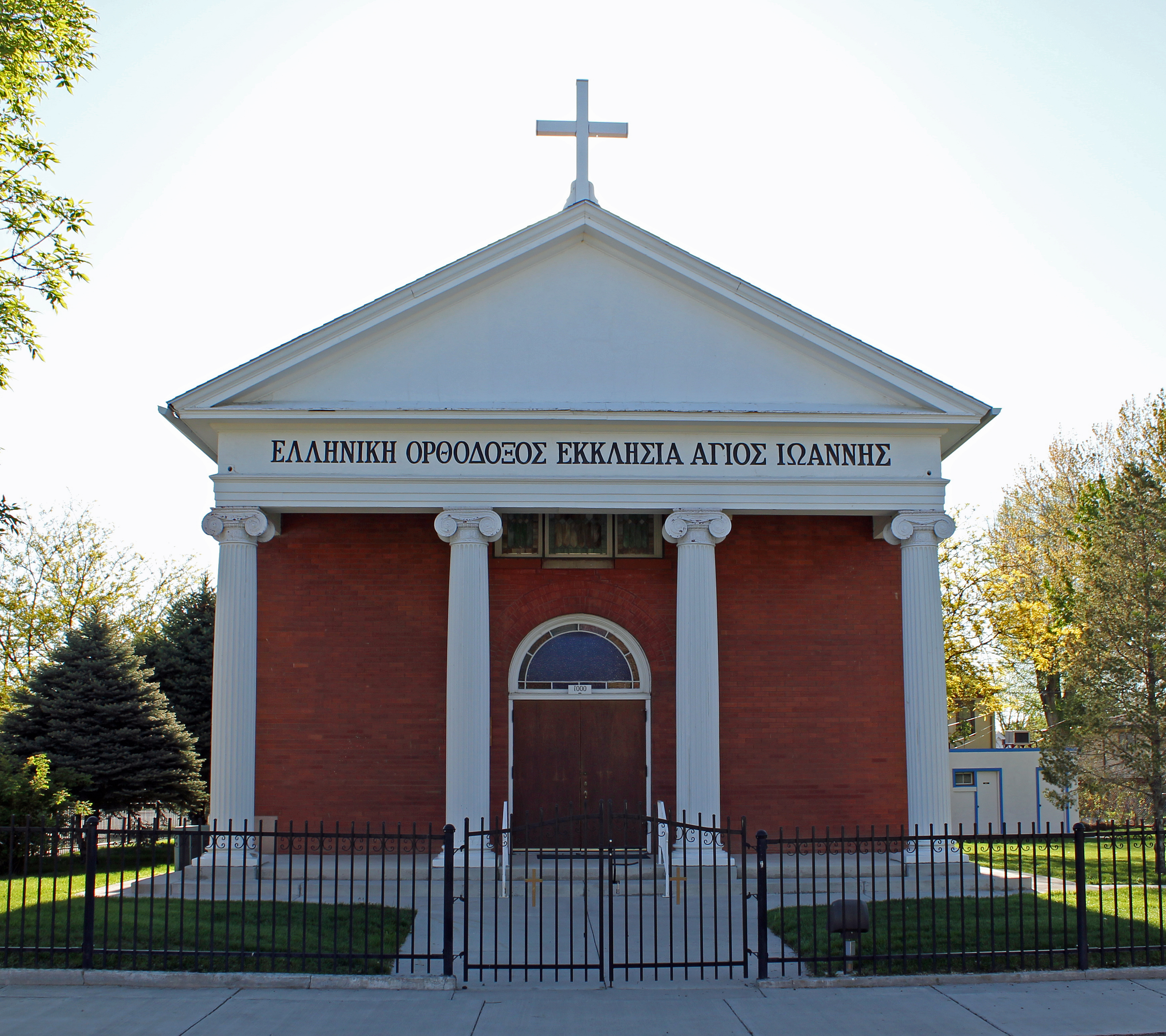

- Location within Colorado Location within the United States
- Location: 1000-1010 Spruce St., Pueblo, Colorado
- Coordinates: 38°14′58″N 104°37′0″W
- Area: less than one acre
- Built: 1907
- Architectural style: Classical Revival
- NRHP reference No.: 02000123
- Added to NRHP: February 28, 2002

St. John's Greek Orthodox Church is a historic church building in Pueblo, Colorado. It was listed on the National Register of Historic Places in 2002.

It is a Classical Revival-style church. It has two-story Ionic columns.
