= Saint George Church, Shmankivchyky (Orthodox Church of Ukraine) =

Ukrainian Orthodox church in Shmankivchyky, Ukraine

Saint George Church
- Церква святого великомученика Юрія Переможця
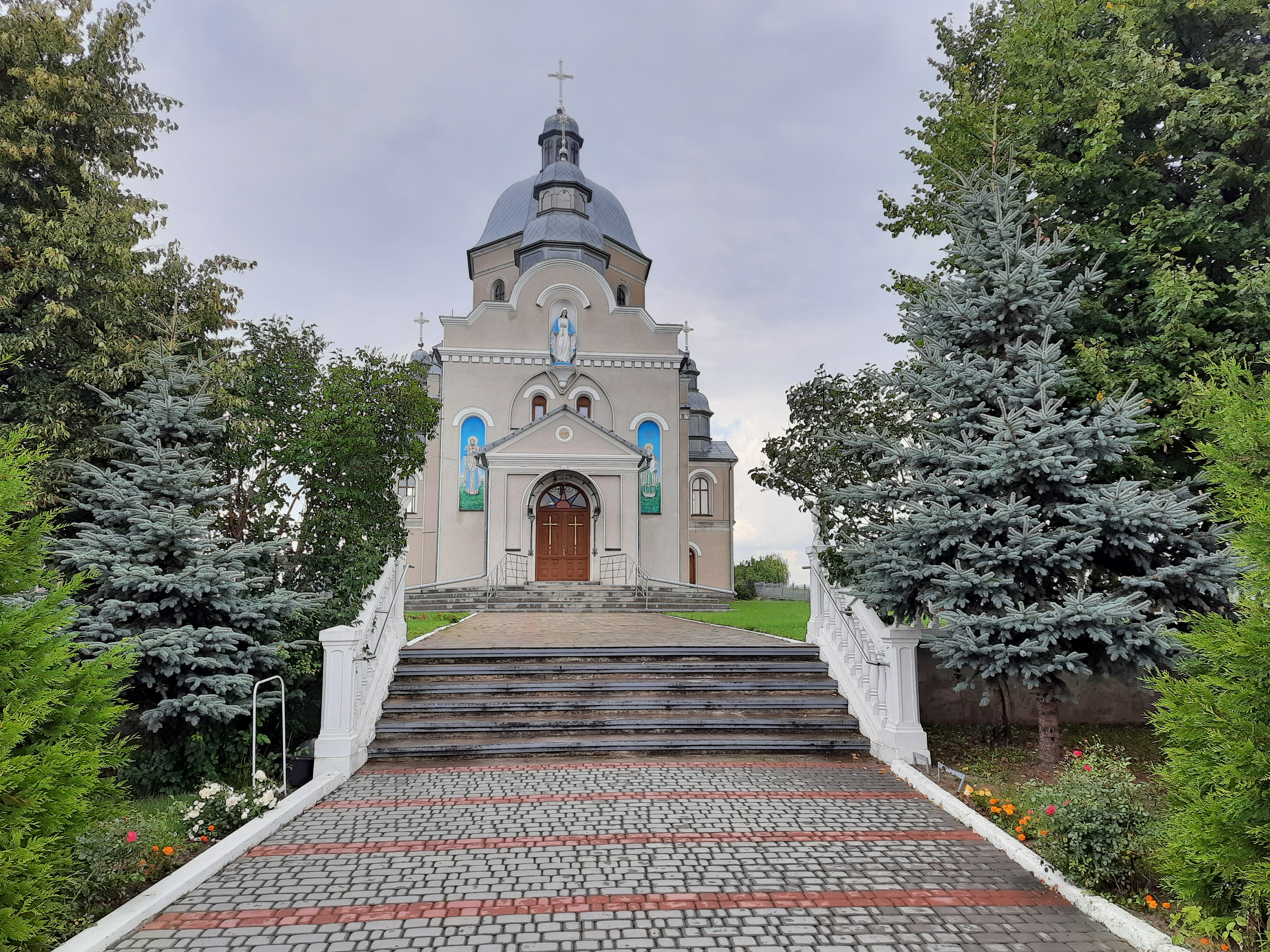

- Location within Ternopil Oblast

Religion
- Affiliation: Orthodox Church of Ukraine

Location
- Location: Shmankivchyky
- Coordinates: 48°58′40″N 25°55′02″E

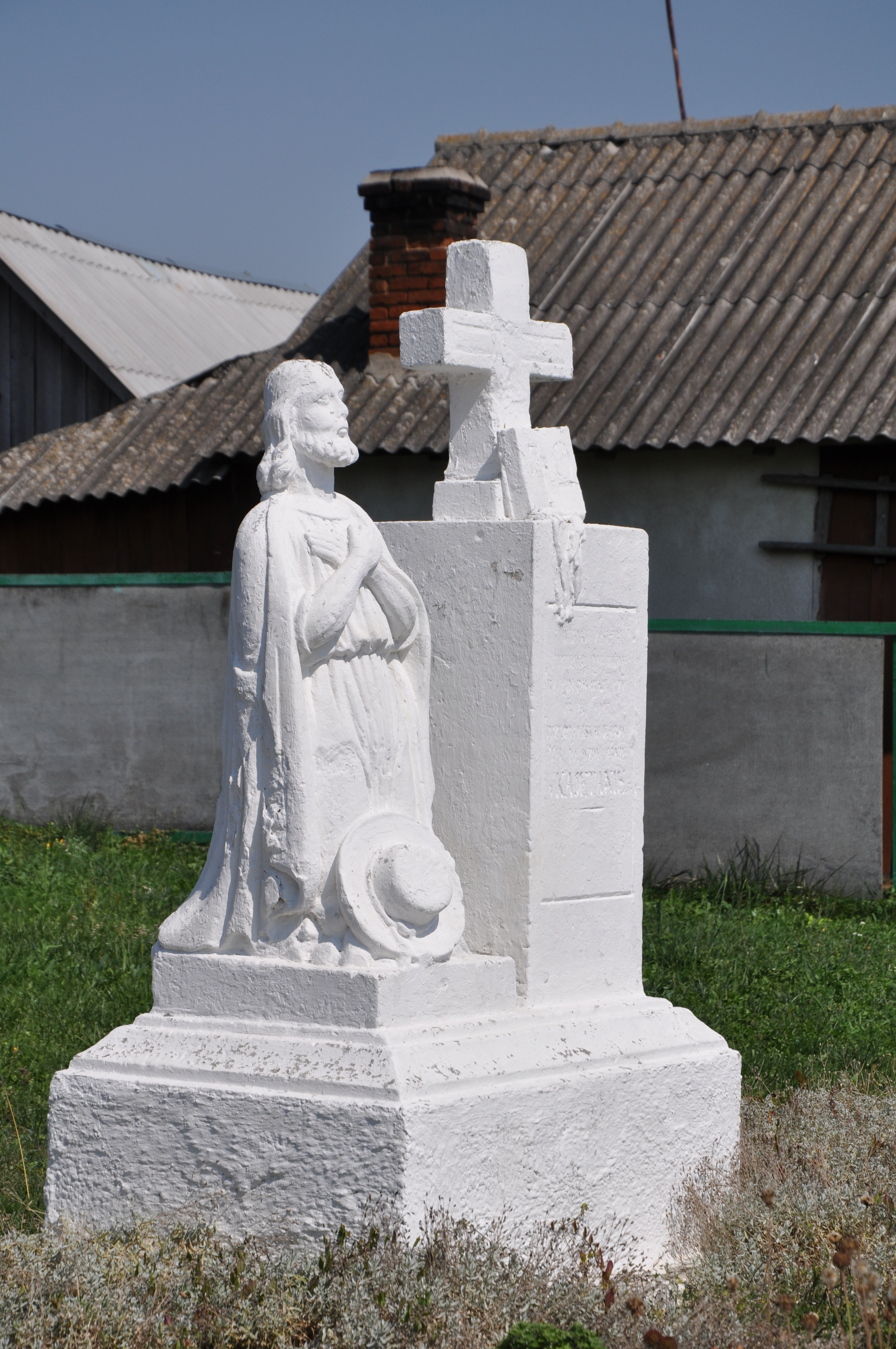
Sculpture of St. Caetano

Saint George Church (Ukrainian: Церква святого великомученика Юрія Переможця) orthodox parish church (PCU) in Shmankivchyky of the Zavodske settlement hromada of the Chortkiv Raion of the Ternopil Oblast.

== History ==
Historically, Shmankivchyky was part of the parish of the neighboring village of Shmankivtsi. However, there was a chapel in the village, built in 1872, where the former landlords were buried. Although the chapel was managed by the landlord, the Greek-Catholic community had the right to use it.

In 1989, on the feast of Demetrius, the cornerstone was consecrated for a new church, which the community began to build with joint efforts. However, the community later split into Orthodox and Greek Catholics. As a result, the newly built church began to be used by the Orthodox community, and Greek Catholics started attending services in neighboring villages.

The Church of the Holy Great Martyr George the Victorious was built from the autumn of 1989 to 1993 and consecrated on 11 August 1996. The painting was completed in 1998–1999. Bishop Pavlo of Ternopil and Terebovlya conducted a service in the church.

On 8 June 2009, an unusual event occurred: a transparent liquid with a red tinge appeared on a jug of holy water collected by Stefania Lesyk, 63. The abbot, Father Volodymyr Svarychenskyi, declared it a miracle, after which services began to be held over the jug.

On December 15, 2018, the church and the parish moved to the OCU.

The chairman of the church committee is Volodymyr Sadliak. Ivan Semeniuk and Danyil Kuz were active members of the church fraternity. The community has more than 600 members.

A stone sculpture of St. Cajetan, made in 1876, was formerly located on the church grounds but was later moved to the village cemetery.

== Sources ==
- с. Шманьківчики. Храм св. вмч. Юрія Переможця // Храми Української Православної Церкви Київського патріархату. Тернопільщина / Автор концепції Куневич Б.; головний редактор Буяк Я.; фото: Снітовський О., Крочак І., Кислинський Е., Бурдяк В. — Тернопіль : ТОВ «Новий колір», 2012. — С. 384. : іл. — ISBN 978-966-2061-24-6.
