= St. George Orthodox Church, Chungathara =

Church in India

Coordinates: 11°20′15″N 76°16′40″E

St. George Orthodox Church is the biggest church in Chungathara, Kerala, India. It was built before 1960.

It is part of the Malankara Orthodox Syrian Church and is located within the Diocese of Malabar; in 2024 the pastor is Father Mathew Vattiyanickal.

Malabar's biggest Orthodox convention organised by this church every year in January lasts for eight days, the conventions end with 5-inmel Qurbana approximately 10000 people attending the Qurbana.
