= St. Spyridon Greek Orthodox Church =

Church in Manhattan, New York

Coordinates: 40.848957°N 73.936025°W

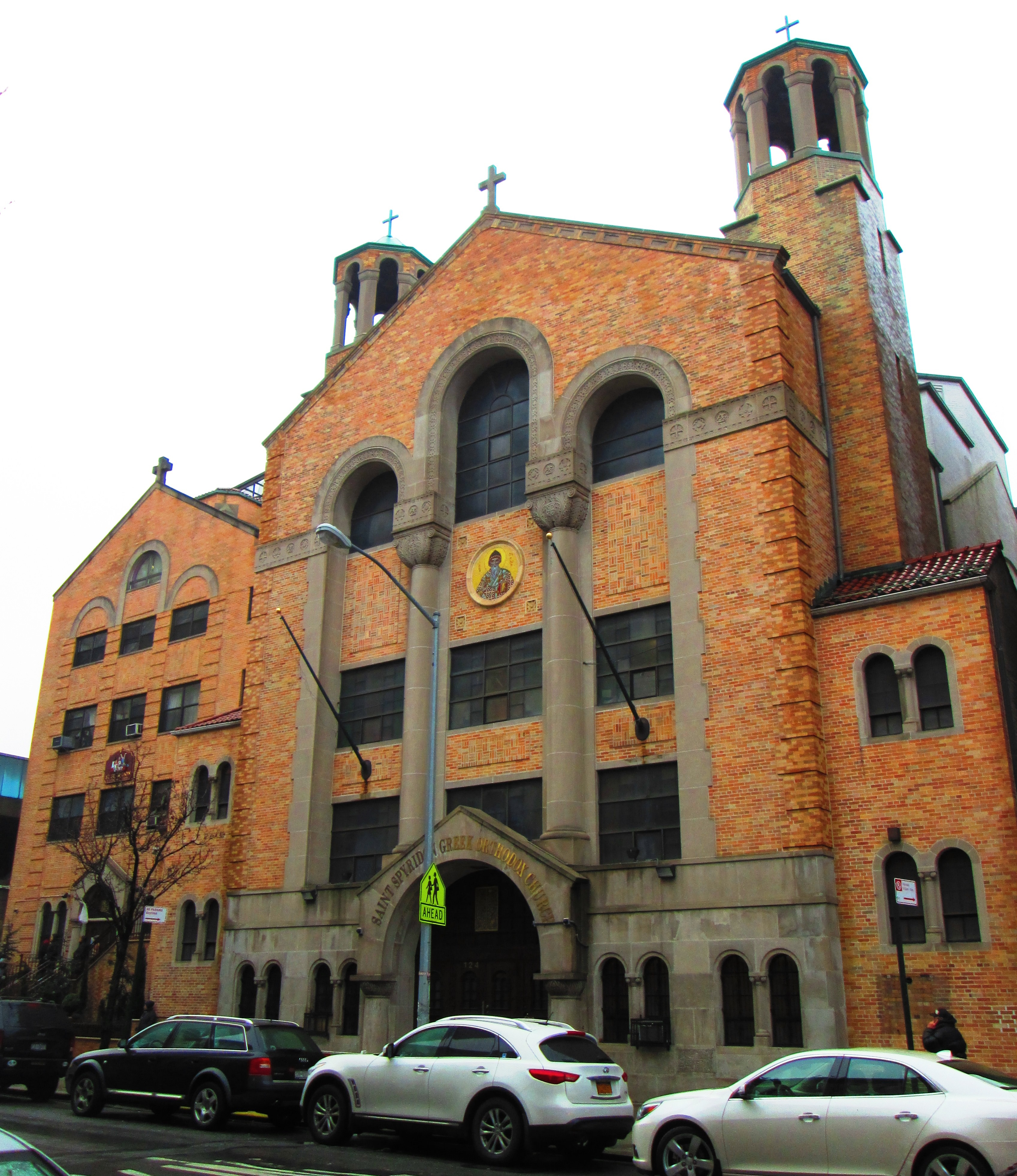
St. Spyridon Church

St. Spyridon Greek Orthodox Church is a parish of the Greek Orthodox Church located at 124 Wadsworth Avenue in the Washington Heights neighborhood of Manhattan. It is known for its elaborate Byzantine revival church and for the building's elaborately decorated interior, featuring traditional Byzantine-style wall painting.

== History ==
The present building was dedicated in 1952 by Archbishop Michael of America; the church's previous building was demolished and the congregation worshiped in the nearby Ft. George Presbyterian Church during construction. In the mid-20th century, the neighborhood was home to large numbers of Greek immigrants. By the end of the century, the population of the neighborhood had changed, the congregation was dwindling, and the church was failing financially.

The parish also operated the adjacent St. Spyridon School, which was similarly failing for lack of funds by the end of the century.

Following the destruction of St. Nicholas Greek Orthodox Church in the collapse of the south tower of the World Trade Center in the 2001 September 11 attacks, parishioners of St. Nicholas worshiped at St. Spyridon.

== Architecture ==
The church's Byzantine Revival building was dedicated in 1952. The modern facade features Byzantine-Romanesque tiered arches. The interior is noted for the elaborate, traditional iconography that covers the walls and ceilings, much of it was created when the church was built by Georgios Gliatas, a student of iconographer Fotis Kontoglou. Some of the church's elaborate Byzantine-style woodwork was carved in the 1970s by Konstantinos Pylarinos.
