= Holy Trinity Greek Orthodox Cathedral (Charlotte, North Carolina) =

Holy Trinity Cathedral
- Holy Trinity Greek Orthodox Cathedral
- Front view of the Cathedral

- Location within North Carolina
- 35.2074°N 80.8531°W
- Location: Charlotte, North Carolina
- Country: United States
- Denomination: Greek Orthodox
- Website: http://htgo.org/

History
- Status: Cathedral

Administration
- Archdiocese: Greek Orthodox Archdiocese of America
- Diocese: Metropolis of Atlanta

Clergy
- Archbishop: Elpidophoros of America
- Bishop: Sevastianos of Atlanta
- Dean: Jonathan Resmini

Holy Trinity Cathedral is a Greek Orthodox cathedral in Charlotte, North Carolina The Cathedral is the only Eastern Orthodox Cathedral in the state of North Carolina, and the mother church of Greek Orthodoxy in North Carolina. Holy Trinity Cathedral is within the jurisdiction of the Greek Orthodox Archdiocese of America led by Elpidophoros of America and the Greek Orthodox Diocese of Atlanta, led by Alexios of Atlanta. The cathedral was built in 1954.

Every year the YiaSou Greek Festival takes place in early September in the area surrounding the Cathedral, and it is considered to be one of the busiest festivals in the State.
