= St. George Antiochian Orthodox Church =

St. George Antiochian Orthodox Church may refer to:

- St. George Antiochian Orthodox Church (Lowell, Massachusetts)
- St. George Antiochian Orthodox Church (Montreal)
- St. George Antiochian Orthodox Church (Orlando, Florida)

== See also ==
- St. George's Cathedral, London, an Antiochian Orthodox Church in England
