= Saint Demetrios Greek Orthodox Church (Jersey City, New Jersey) =

Greek Orthodox parish

Coordinates: 40.731810°N 74.059710°W

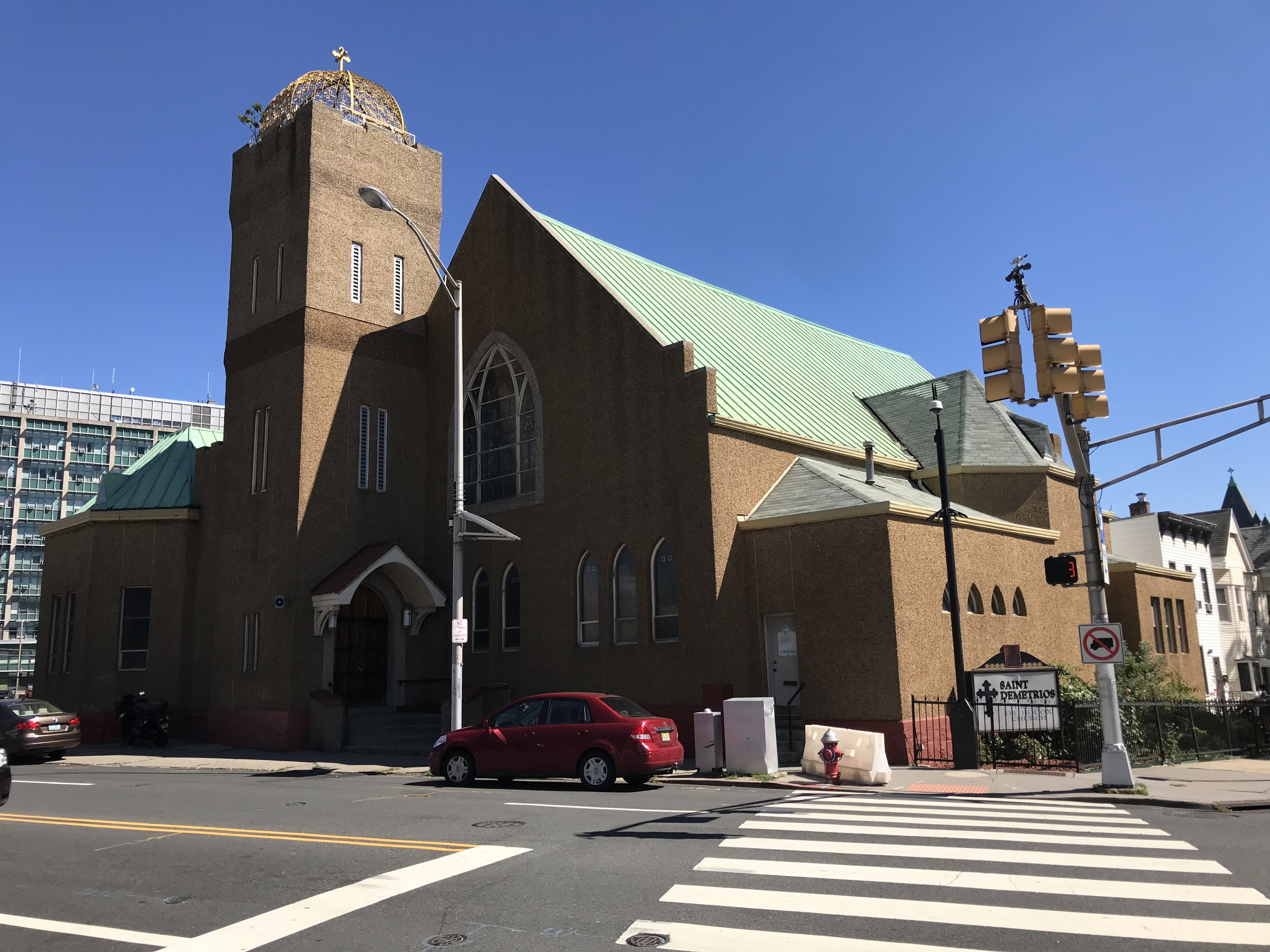
- Founder: Demetrios Magos
- Location: Jersey City, New Jersey, U.S.
- Board of directors: President George Kalogridis
- Affiliations: GOARCH, GOYA
- Website: Saint Demetrios

Saint Demetrios Greek Orthodox Church is a Greek Orthodox parish in Jersey City, New Jersey founded before 1920. The church has been active for over 100 years. It features an incredible local history. The church was visited by former President of Cyprus Makarios III. The Pontus Society has been active since 1929. The church is located behind Journal Square. It is easily accessible by public transportation. There are two Greek Orthodox churches in Jersey City, the other one is Evangelismos Tis Theotokou. Both churches are under the jurisdiction of the Greek Orthodox Metropolis of New Jersey.

== History ==
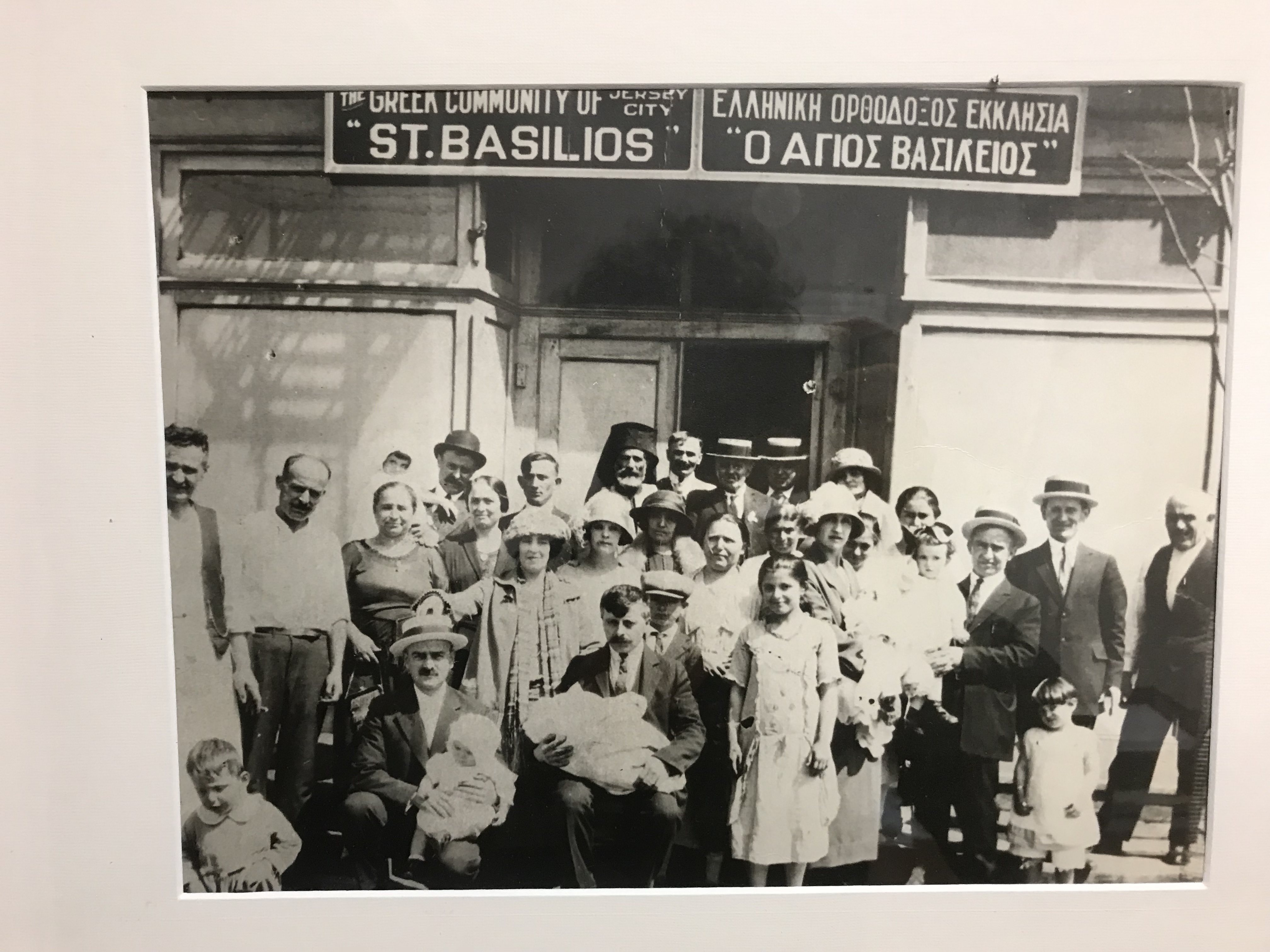
Saint Demetrios Original Church

The first full-time priest was father Angelo Tsigounis. The original name of the community church was Saint Vasilios then it was called the Church of Our Savior. The original community was founded sometime before 1920. It was located at 310 Fairmont Ave in Jersey City, New Jersey from 1925-1926. The church stayed in Jersey City but moved to Tonnelle Ave from 1926-1928. The name of the church was changed to Saint Demetrios when the church moved again to York Street from 1928-1936. The church was renamed to honor Demetrios Magos, they named the church Saint Demetrios. He donated a building for the church. It was originally a Jewish Community Center and the community remained in Jersey City. From 1936 until the 1970s the church was located on 240 Montgomery Street in downtown Jersey City.

The priest of the church remained Angelo Tsigounis. There was a very large Greek community in Jersey City. Angelo Tsigounis eventually became a Protopresviteros. The highest position a married priest could attain. He died January 8, 1948, during a big snowstorm while helping the poor and destitute. His son James Tsigounis also became a priest to honor his father. The church featured countless parades. They also had picnics from 1934 to the 1950s. Famous scholar Father Chris Christodoulou was the priest of the church between 1951-1953. He was friends with the former President of Cyprus Makarios III. Makarios visited the church in 1952, he was Archbishop of Cyprus at the time. Greek American Jazz composer Nick Roubanis was associated with the church. He is accredited with writing the song Misirlou.

The original church was a small cathedral-like building. The congregation grew too large by the 1970s the church moved to 524 Summit Ave. The Greek Orthodox congregation replaced an already existent Protestant Church at 524 Summit Ave in 1971. President Peter Karavoulias and Father George Oikonomou bought the present church for $65,000.

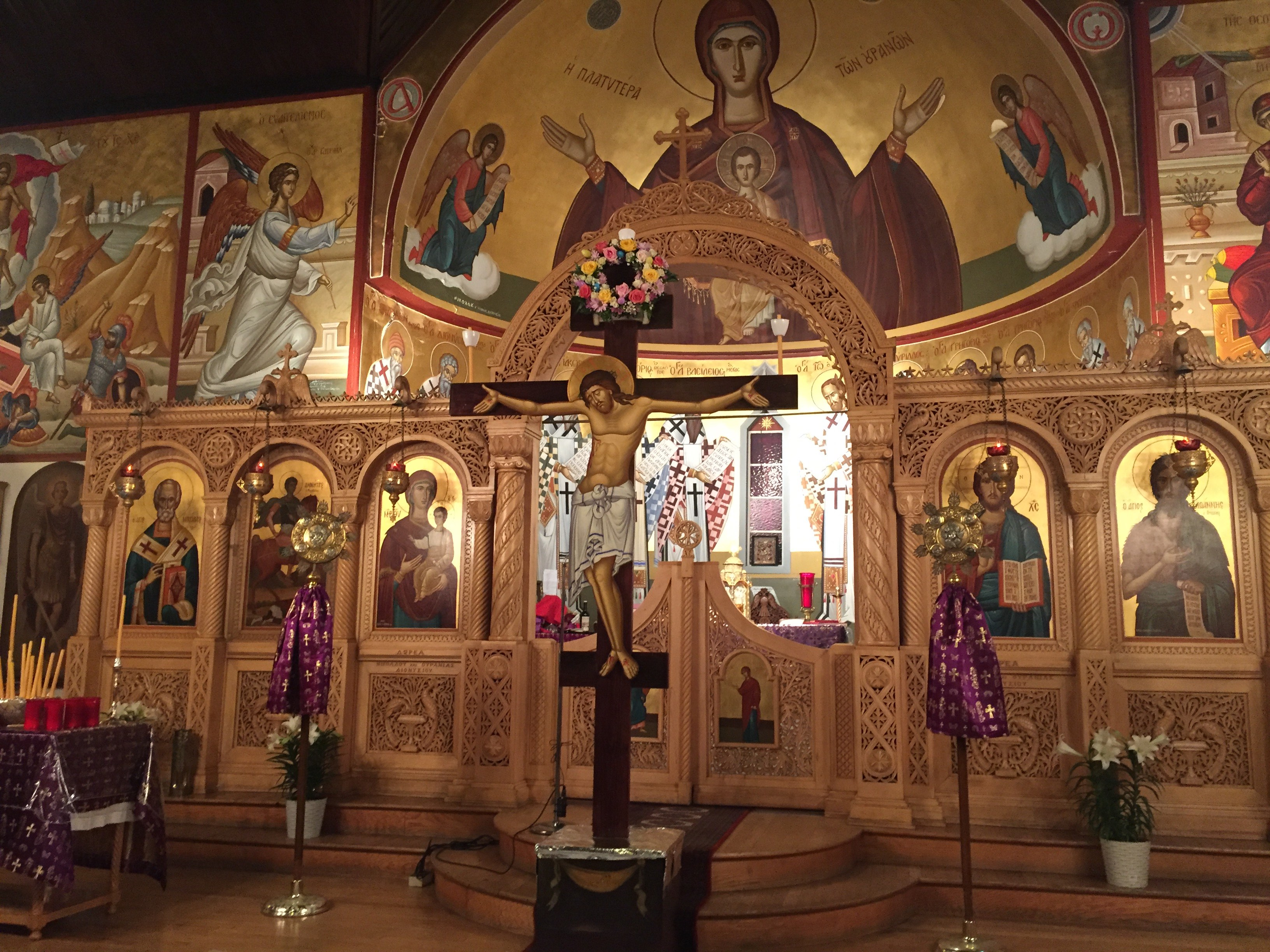
Iconostasis

The current building is a medium chapel with a decorative tower. The Iconostasis or Templon, is a traditional artistic framework venerating Christ, the Virgin, and the church's patron Saint Demetrios. The apse is adorned by the Theotokos who overshadows the entire church. The style resembles the Virgin and Child within the apse of Hagia Sophia and the Pantokrator Jesus in the Apse overlooking Monreale Cathedral Sicily, Italy 1180-1190. The church maintains the traditional Byzantine style. To the left of the Theotokos is a narrative depicting the Resurrection and to the right of the Theotokos is a narrative depicting the Annunciation. The church holds a massive collection of orthodox iconography venerating many saints, some are very old. The church also won many awards as a member of the Greek Orthodox Youth of America GOYA.

== Societies ==
The church is home to the Pontic Society. The society preserves the memory of the Pontic Greeks that were massacred during the Pontic genocide (1913-1922). The society was founded in 1929 by Greek Pontic refugees. It holds yearly meetings and events in Jersey City New Jersey. The church also has a Philoptochos society. The society is dedicated to helping the poor and destitute. The church offers two yearly festivals to raise money. One is held every year in September at the Jersey City All About Downtown Street Fair. The other is held in February during Greek Apokreas (carnival season).

== Priests ==
- Angelo Tsigounis (1923-1948)
- Charlie Goumanis (1948-1951)
- Chris Christodoulou (1951-1953)
- Dr. Peter Kalelis (1954 1955)
- George Longos (1955-1956)
- Paul Apostolakos (1956-1962)
- George Prasas (1962-1963)
- George Oikonomou (1962-1987)
- Kyrillos Markopoulos (1987-2005)
- Chrysanthos Zoes (2006-2013)
- Nicholas Raphael (2014-2015)
- Angelo John Michaels (2015-1/2024)
- Archimandrite Anastasios Garaboa (2024- Nov 2024)
- Archimandrite Philotheos Tomczewski (Nov 2024-) Special Saturday Services due to priest shortage

== Gallery ==
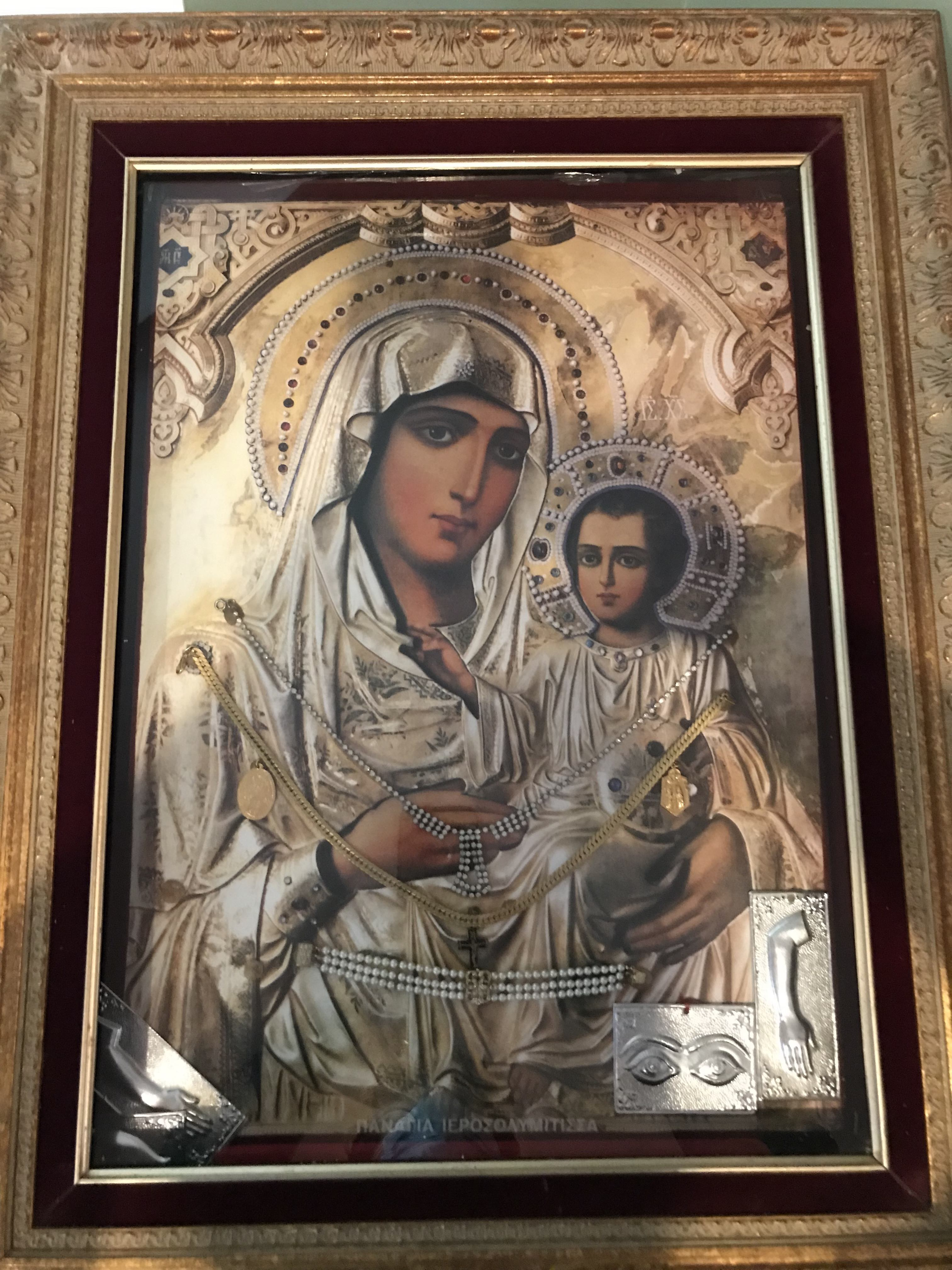
Virgin and Child

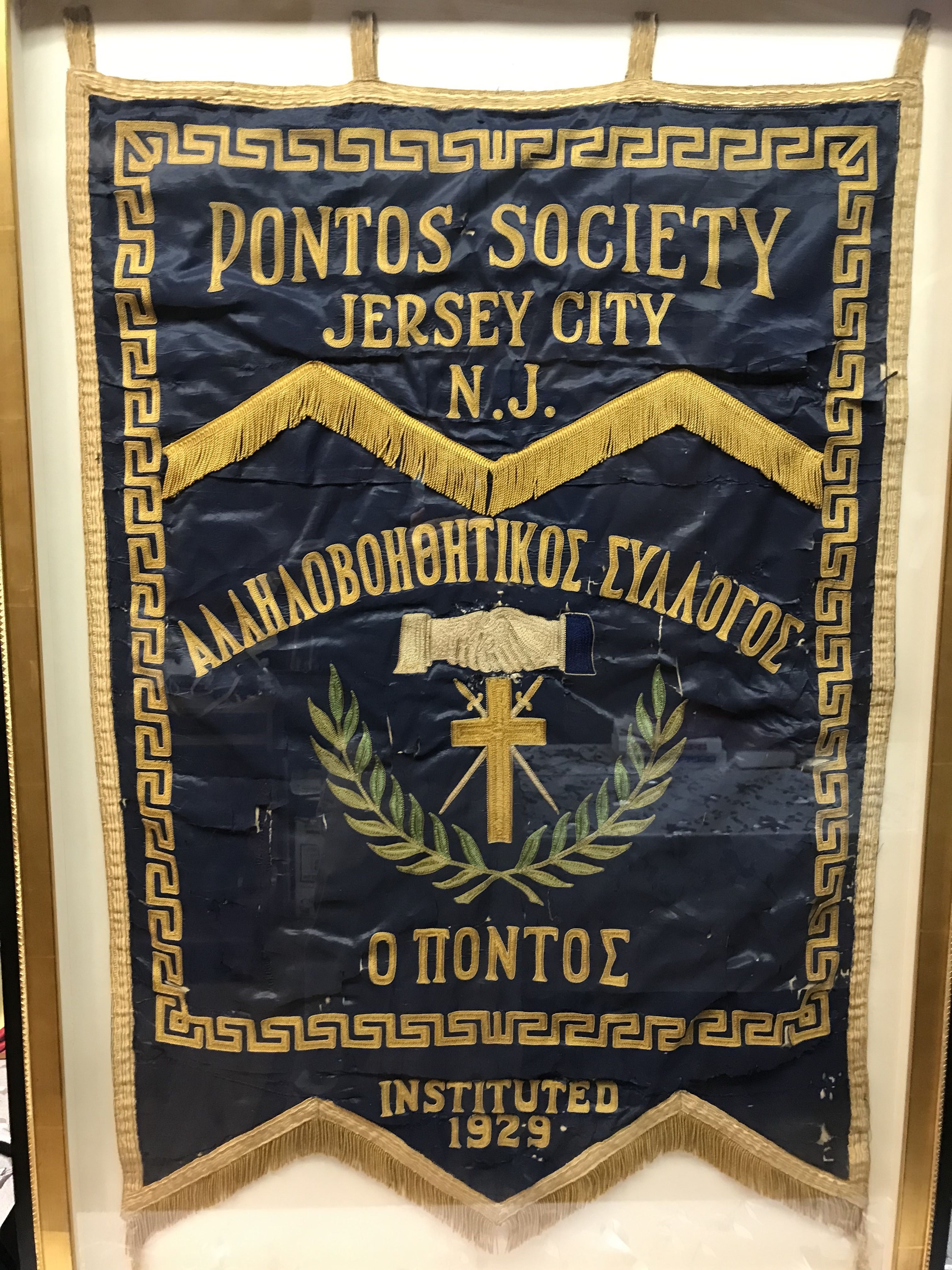
Pontos Society Jersey City

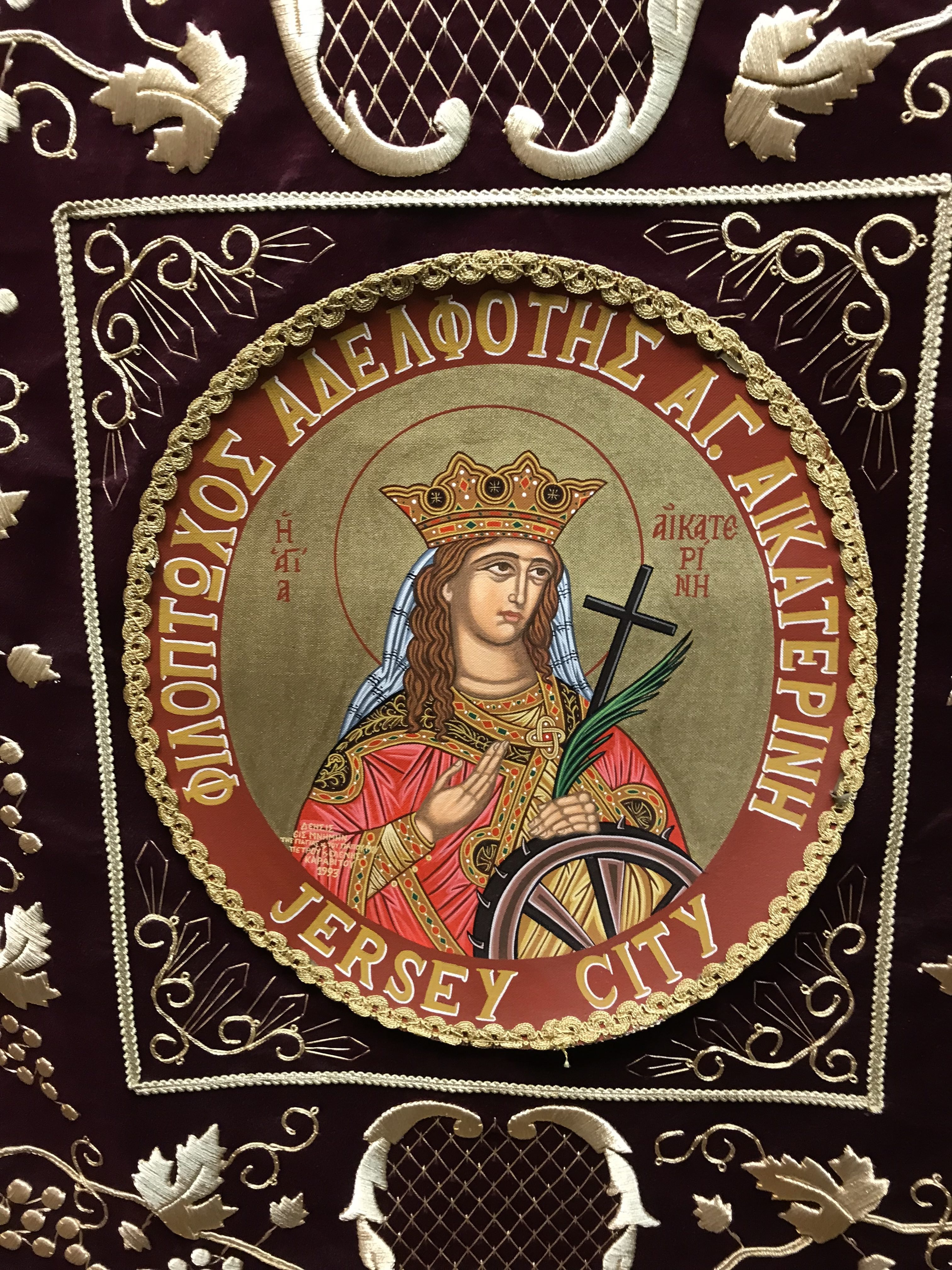
Philoptochos Society

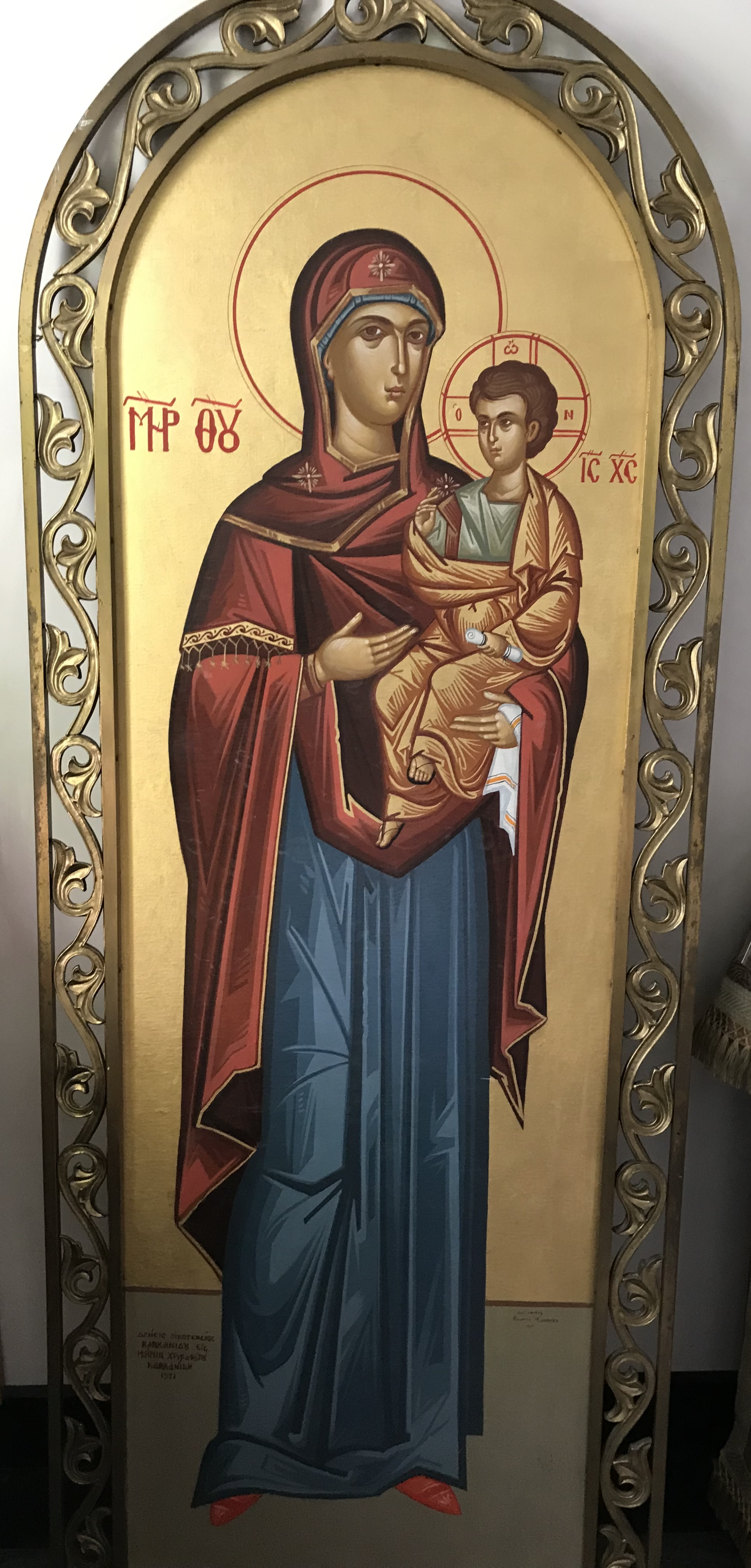
Virgin and Child

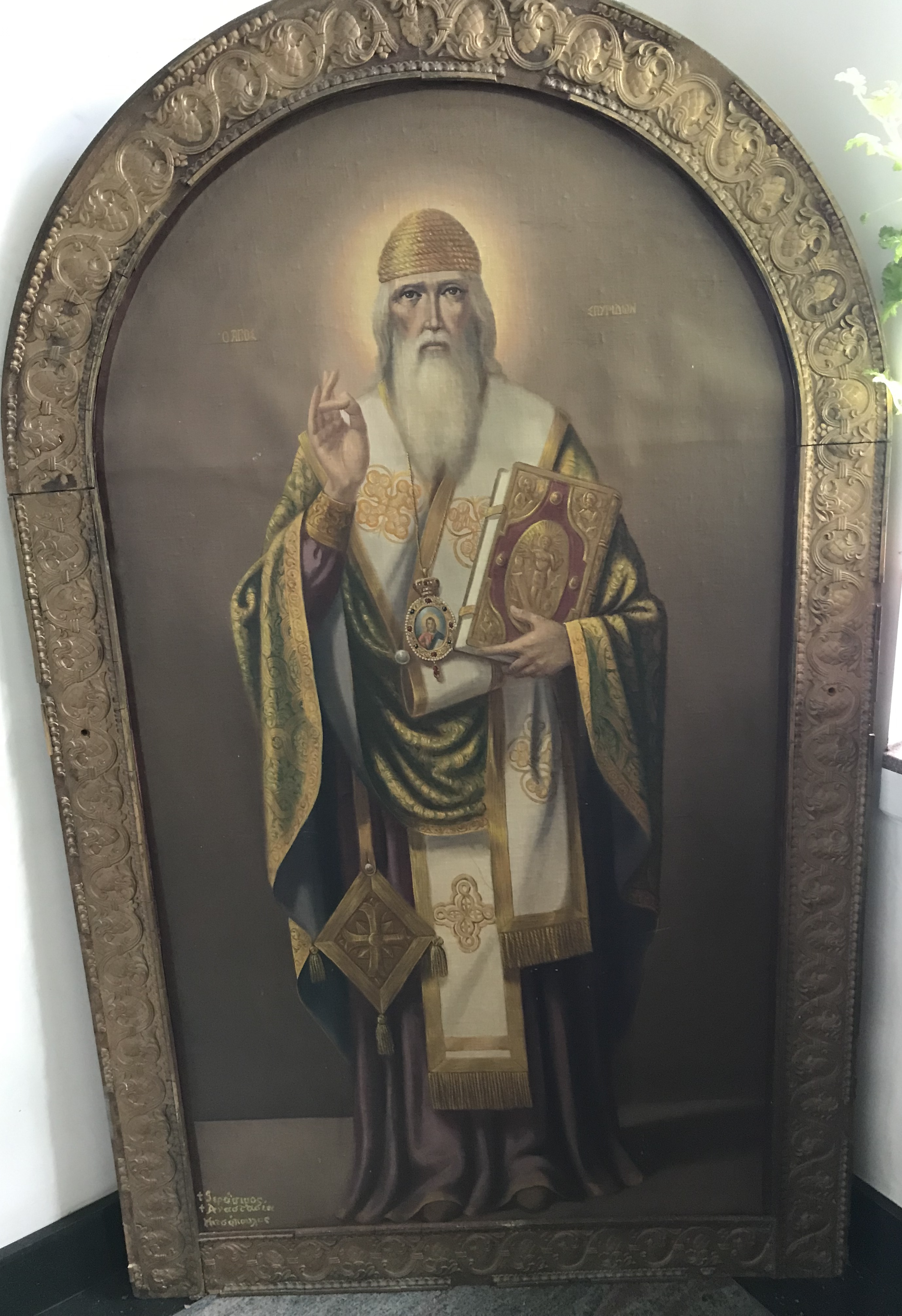
Agios Spiridon

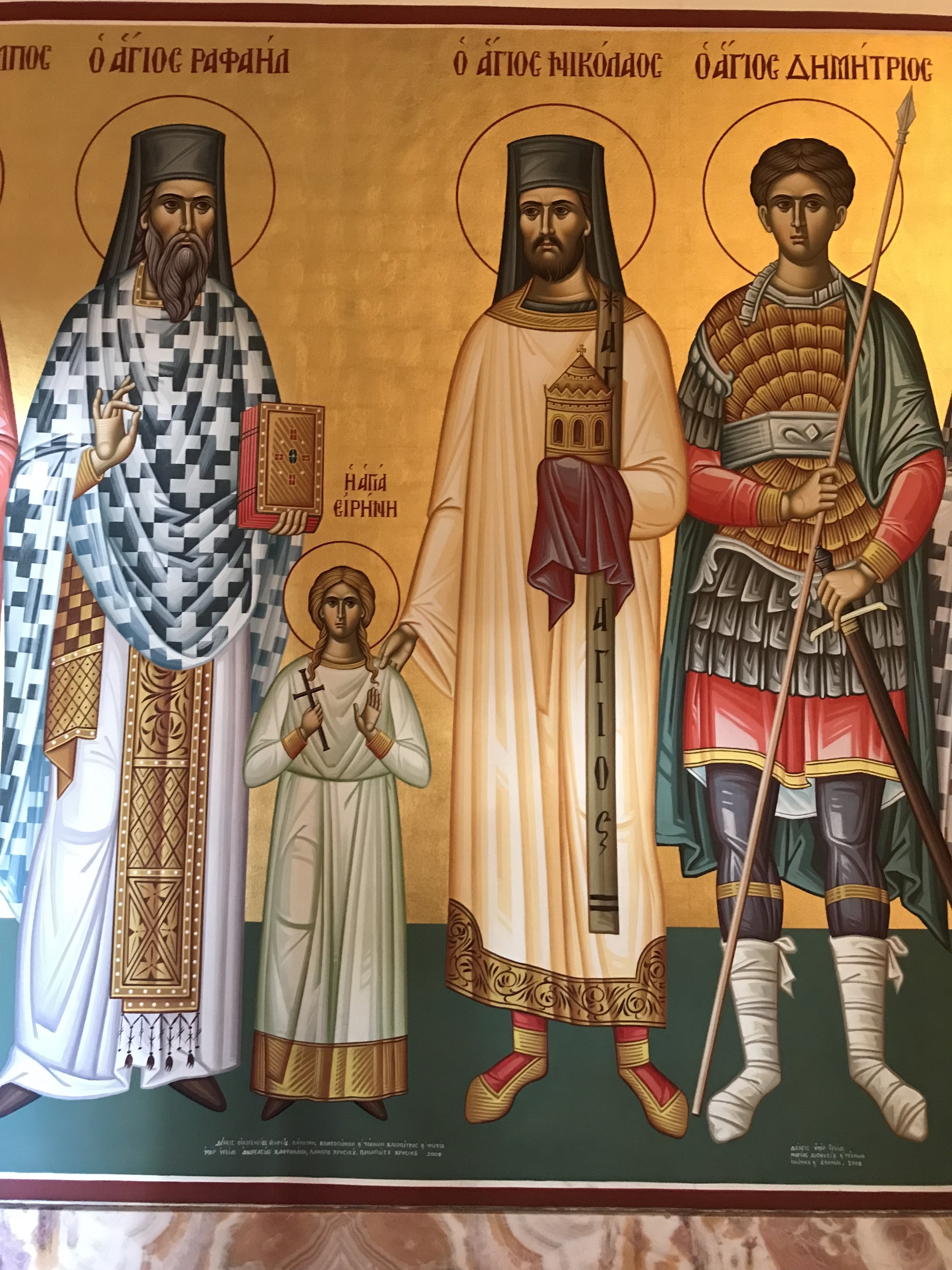
Saint Raphael, Nicholas, and Irene with Saint Demetrios

== Bibliography ==
- Melis, Mark (director) (1987). Documentary of Saint Demetrios Jersey City [Narrated by Andy Kyriakakis] (Documentary Film). Jersey City: Saint Demetrios Church Jersey City.
