= Greek Orthodox Church of St. George (Piscataway, New Jersey) =

Church building in New Jersey, U.S.

Coordinates: 40°30′48.03″N 74°28′18.99″W

St. George Greek Orthodox Church
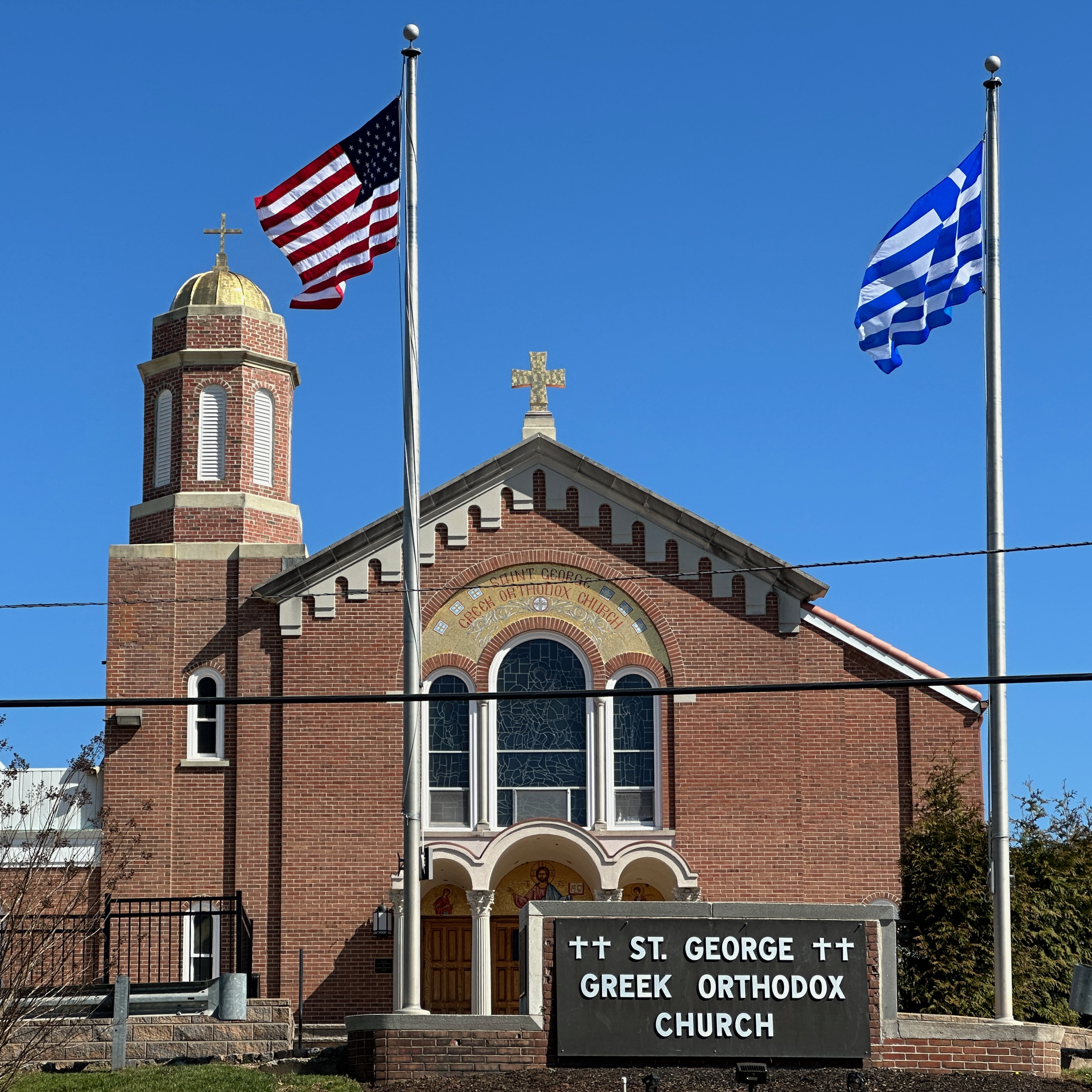
- Formation: 1917
- Founder: Gregory Konstantakos
- Founded at: New Brunswick, NJ
- Location: Piscataway, New Jersey, U.S.
- Region served: Central New Jersey
- Presiding Priest: Very Reverend Arch. Father Nektarios Cottros
- Deacon: Rev. Deacon Symeon Williams
- Parish President: George Athansopoulos
- Board of directors: President: George Athanasopoulos; VP of Administration: Vassilis Keramidas; VP of Operations: Constantine Apostolakis; Treasurer: Michael Sirimis, CPA; Secretary: Eleni Parlapanides; Janitor: Costa
- Affiliations: GOARCH, GOYA
- Website: https://gocnj.org/

St. George Greek Orthodox Church Chatechism Program

Location
- 1101 River Road Piscataway, New Jersey

Information
- Type: Catechism Program Pre-k-12
- Established: 1916
- Principal: Paul Stevens
- Vice principals: Lemonia Malhias; Maggie Stravianidis; James Solomos
- Faculty: 20.0 FTEs
- Grades: Pre-K-10-12
- Enrollment: 225 (estimate as of 2020–21)
- Student to teacher ratio: 5.0:1
- Campus: 3 acres (12,000 m^{2})
- Colors: Purple and White
- Athletics: 3 sports
- Athletics conference: NJ GOYA group 2
- Team name: Chargers

St. George Greek Orthodox Church Greek School

Location
- 1101 River Road Piscataway, New Jersey

Information
- Type: Greek School Pre-k-12
- Established: 1916
- Principal: Toula Karamarkos
- Teachers: Sofia Amaxopoulos; Katerina Kourti; Chrisoula Plias
- Faculty: 4.0 FTEs
- Grades: Pre-K-7
- Enrollment: 225 (estimate as of 2020–21)
- Student to teacher ratio: 11.0:1
- Campus: 3 acres (12,000 m^{2})
- Colors: Purple and White
- Athletics: 3 sports
- Athletics conference: NJ GOYA group 2
- Team name: Chargers
- Tuition: $350.00

St. George Piscataway
2021-2022 St. George Piscataway Basketball
- First season: 1960's
- Athletic director: Coach Nick Kambitsis
- Head coach: John Lyssikatos; 4 season, 15–4 (.789)
- Location: Piscataway, New Jersey
- Stadium: St. George Gym (capacity: 100)
- Conference: NJ GOYA Group 2
- Division: South
- Rivalries: Asbury Park-Ocean
- Mascot: Charger
- Website: gocnj.org

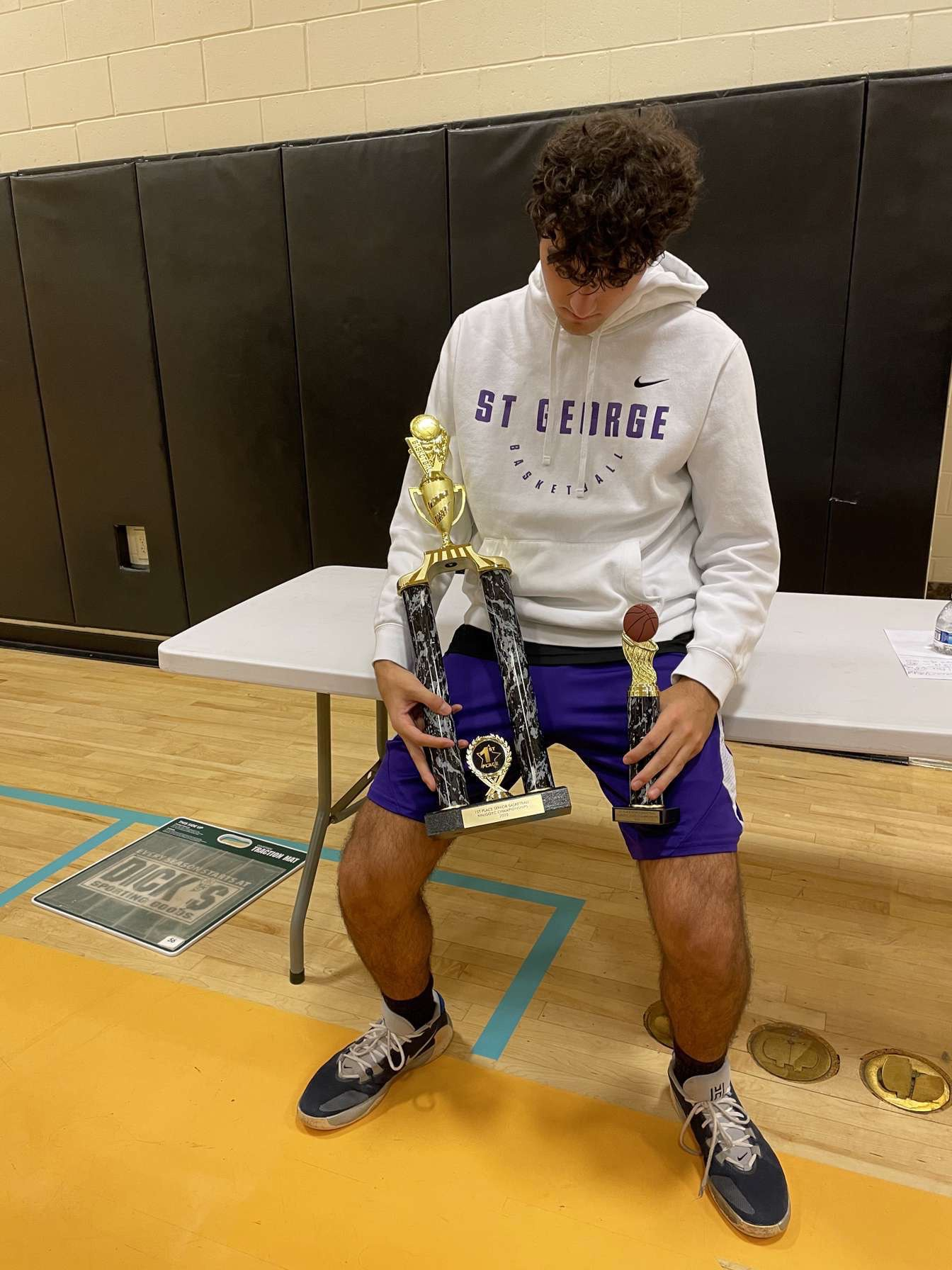
Forward/Center Andrea "Jaguar" Hadjiloucas holding the 1st-place trophy

The Greek Orthodox Church of St. George of Piscataway, New Jersey is the largest Greek congregation in New Jersey, US. In 2016 the congregation celebrated its 100th anniversary as well as the 43rd anniversary of its Greek Festival.

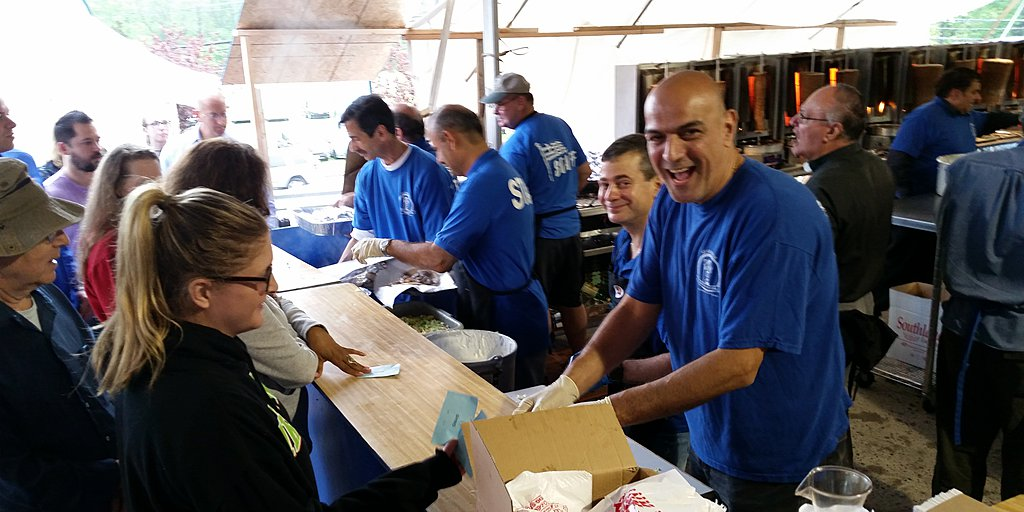
GOYA Advisor George Hadjiloucas taking Gyro Orders

== History of St. George ==
On July 19, 1917, the Greek Orthodox community of New Brunswick was incorporated. Sunday liturgies for the members of this new community were held on the second floor of the Eagles’ Hall, on the corner of Neilson and Church Streets and, as there was no permanent priest, a different priest officiated each Sunday.

However, the new community floundered. After about a year of existence, the Board of Trustees dissolved and Church services in the Eagles' Hall were stopped.

A second group of men met in 1918 and discussed how to build a permanent Church. Thus the first St. George building fund was spear-headed by Nicholas Chilakos, John Stroumtsos, Father Vasilios Daskalakis, and Nicholas Konstantakos (who served as Treasurer). They raised money for the new Church, with church services begun again, this time at the Christ Episcopal Church (also in New Brunswick). At the same time, a Greek School and a new Board of Trustees were formed. John Stroumtsos was President of the new Board.

The cost of the new Church was estimated to be US$12,770, and the land on which it would sit would cost $1,300 (total: $14,079). A mortgage of $5,000 was taken out by the new Board with the Middlesex Title Guarantee Company. The lot on which the new church would stand was located at 9 River Road in Highland Park, a central location easily accessed by people from surrounding towns. Construction began in 1918 and was completed in 1919. The total cost of this building was $12,770. Imbedded in the cornerstone of this building is a bottle containing the listing of the first Board of Trustees. Father George Spyridakis was the priest when the land was bought, but was later reassigned to the Newark community. The first priest of the newly built church was Father Daskalakis.

In the early years the treasury often lacked the necessary funds to conduct the church's business, and the community was called upon to give their time and talents. The first paint job was paid for by founder Gregory Mackaronis, Father Daskalakis personally paid for the essentials to outfit the "Ayia Trapeza", and Nicholas Costas made repairs to the Church when needed. The community survived and grew.

The internal strife in Greece after World War I had an impact on the Highland Park community. Between 1921 and 1928, a rift developed in the community when parishioners took sides on the political issues affecting Greece. Although there are few records from those years, it was recorded that as a result of the rift there were two Greek schools and two different congregations that held religious services simultaneously. During this time the first Greek School was begun, a constitution was adopted, a choir was formed and the Philoptochos, St. Barbara, was begun. Eventually the rifts were resolved.When World War II began, many young first-generation Greek men of the New Brunswick community went to war; some did not return. With veterans returning to the area and beginning their own families, the founders began thinking in terms of a new church building which would include a community center and classrooms for the Sunday school and Greek School. At the general assembly meeting of December 3, 1944, a building fund committee was created to solicit funds for the construction of a new church and community center with classrooms. On May 18, 1954, the committee transferred the $45,020 collected over the ten-year period to the church treasury. In March 1959 the general assembly authorized the board of trustees to appoint a committee to study the feasibility of building a new church and community center. On June 21, 1960, by an overwhelming majority, the general assembly voted to purchase the land located at the corner of River Road and Riverview Avenue. Upon this approval architect William A. Loumos was retained to begin drawing the plans and specifications as recommended by the Board. Finally, on January 22, 1961, the general assembly voted to approve the plans for a new church.

From the year of the first Priest, Father George Spyridakis (1918), through the tenure of Father Nicholas Triandaffillou, the community was served by 12 priests. In 1930, the records show that 10 priests served the community beginning with Father Kanellos Kanellopoulos. Father Anthony N. Pappas, joined the community in January 1959 and, in addition to his clerical duties, served as religious consultant for the new church. Groundbreaking ceremonies for the new Church were held on December 3, 1961. Nine months later, in September 1962, volunteers painted the assembly hall and classrooms. Finally, on December 23, 1962, the first liturgy was held in the new service. Father Pappas blessed the rooms, assembly hall and Church, and communion was administered in the new Church. In March 1963, the Highland Park church was sold to the Byelorussian Autocephalic Orthodox Church of St. Mary of Zurovicy for $30,000.

On May 25, 1969, the new Church was consecrated. The community grew quickly, out-growing the Church building. In 1988 an addition was completed providing additional classroom and meeting room space. In 1991, Father John E. Constantine joined the community until in 1995 he left to continue his service in the U.S. Navy. The following fall, Father John Theodosion joined the community. Theodosion's ordination into the priesthood was held in the Church 1996. In 2001, Father Pappas had served for fifty years as a priest. Father John Theodosion became Proistamenos in 2002 and served the community until April 2004. On May 1, 2004, the Archimandrite Alexander Kile was appointed as the new Proistamenos and served for almost seven years until March 2011 when Father Nicholas Pastrikos joined the community.

== Ordinations ==
On Saturday, December 19, Bishop-elect Ioannis of Phocaea was ordained by Archbishop Elpidophoros of America at the Church of St. George in Piscataway, New Jersey. In his statements to the newspaper The National Herald, the newly ordained bishop stressed that the experience of the history of the Church and the descent of the Holy Spirit caused him enormous tension to the point that it took half an hour to recover after the ordination. On his part, Archbishop Elpidophoros, addressing the Bishop-elect of Phocaea, Ioannis, stated that, by a blessed happenstance, they found themselves there in Piscataway, “in the parish that you served when you were first ordained a priest.” Addressing those present, the Archbishop of America stressed that many may be surprised to learn that Phocaea, on the coast of Asia Minor, was the center of Hellenic life and thought over two-thousand-five-hundred years ago. On his part, Bishop Ioannis thanked Ecumenical Patriarch Bartholomew, “under his ministry, I was elected by the Holy Synod in the Holy Diocese of Phocaea,” while he also thanked the Archbishop of America and the Metropolitan Gerasimos of San Francisco. Bishop Ioannis of Phocaea is the Protosyncellus of the Metropolis of San Francisco, where he will continue to perform his duties on assignment as, according to canonical and church institutions, he will be the Assistant Bishop to Archbishop Elpidophoros of America.

According to The office of the Chancellor of the Greek Orthodox archdiocese of America, Rev. Deacon Simeon Williams has been assigned to Saint George. Deacon Simeon was ordained on October 21, 2023, with the presence of His Eminence Bishop Apostolos and Chancellor V. Rev. Father Christophoros.

== Rutgers football parking ==
Saint George offers convenient parking during Scarlet Knight home games. Their property on 34/36 Riverview avenue is also utilized. Parking includes tailgating and catered food for large groups and events. The Church is a 5-minute walk from the SHI stadium.

== St. George athletics ==
St. George has had volleyball for girls 12-18 and basketball for boys 12-18 for many years, with Athletic Director Nick Kambitsis, volleyball coach John Papanastasiou, junior basketball coach Yianni Apostolakis, and Senior Basketball Coach John Lyssikatos.

== Junior basketball ==
The Junior Basketball team is for players ages 12 to 14, or 7th-9th grade.

=== List of coaches ===
Name	Role	Tenure
Tony Fiotakis	Head coach	2010-2014
Aleko Trahelis	Assistant coach	2010-2014
Manoli Fiotakis	Head coach	2014-2018
Nick Hionis	Assistant coach	2014-2015
Yianni Apostolakis	Assistant coach; Head coach	2015-2018; 2021–present
Joe Hirschman	Assistant coach	2018-2019
Nick Kambitsis	Head coach; Assistant Coach	1984-1990, 2018–2022 2022–present
Demos Hantsoulis	Assistant; Head coach	2018-2022; 2022-2023

== Senior basketball ==
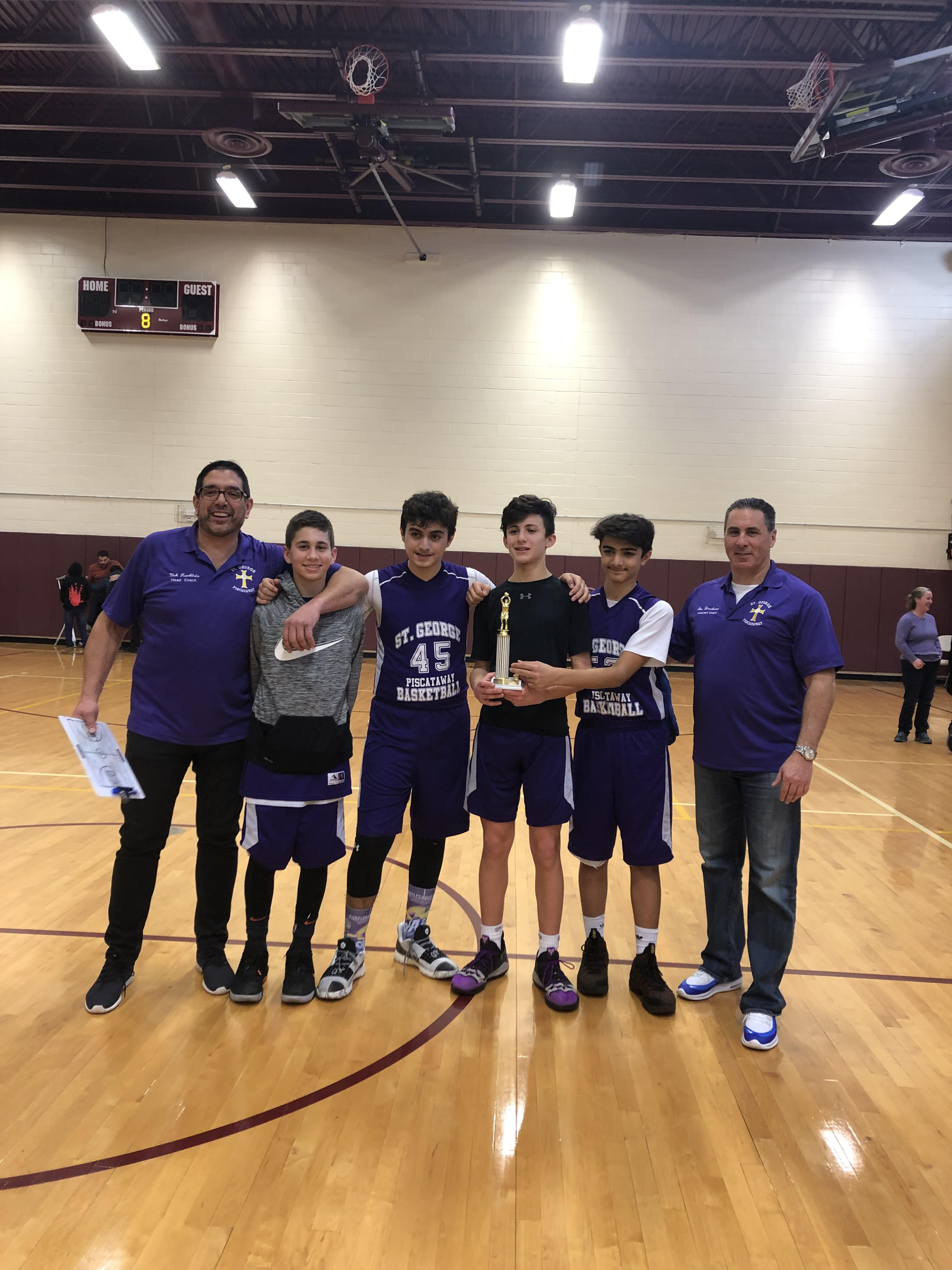
(left to right) Athletic Director and Coach Nick Kambitsis, Dimitri Hirschman, Andreas Hadjilouca of Limassol, Chris Vlahos, Evangelos Kambitsis and Assistant Coach Joe Hirschman winning their 2019 NJ South Championship

The senior basketball team is for players ages 14–18, or players 9th-12th grade.

== List of Coaches ==
Name	Role	Tenure
John Lyssikatos	Head coach	2012-2014
Nick Hionis	Head coach	2014-2015
Yianni Apostolakis	Assistant coach	2014-2015
John Lyssikatos	Head coach	2015-2016
Lambro Bouridimos	Head coach	2016-2018
Constantine Apostolakis	Assistant coach	2016-2018
John Lyssikatos	Head coach	2018–present
Joe Hirschman	Assistant coach	2019–present
Nick Kambitsis	Assistant coach	2021–present
Demos Hantsoulis	Assistant coach	2023–present

== St. George Hall of Fame ==
- Very Reverend Archamidrties Nektarios Cottros- Priest; 2018–present
- Revered Father Anthony Pappas- Former Priest; 1959-2003
- John Lyssikatos- President; 2021–2022 Basketball Coach; 2014–2016; 2018–present
- George Athanasopoulos- President; 2018–2021; 2022–present
- Toula Karamrkos- Greek School Principal
- Detective Paul Stevens- Sunday School Principal
- Jim Solomos- Beloved St. George Parishioner and Sunday School teacher
- John Blazakis- Volunteer Alter Boy
- Kosta Janitor- Former Janitor
- George Hadjiloucas- Beloved GOYA Advisor
- Nick Kambitsis- Athletic Director, JR. Basketball Head coach and SR. Basketball assistant coach
- Katina Kehayas-Beloved Choir Director 1973-2021

== GOYA ==
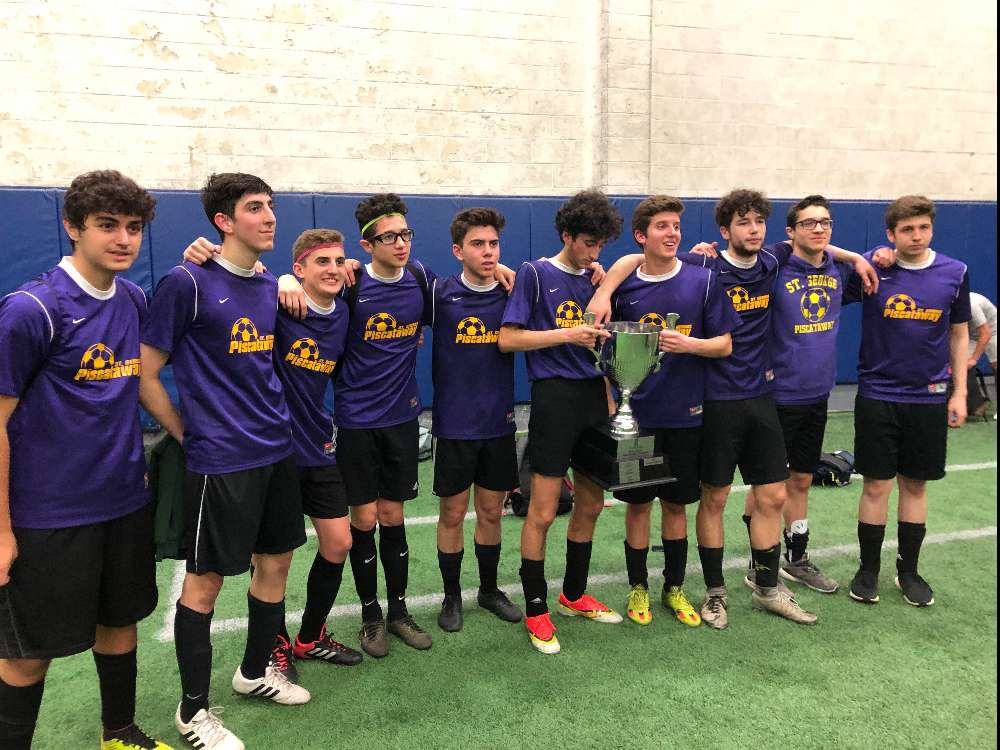
(From left to right) MVP Andreas Hadjiloucas, Dean Stravianidis, Stamati Malouchos, Demetri Kalogridis, Demetri Zambas, Demetri Karandrikas, Toli Malouchos, George Delaurentis, Antoni Kalogridis and Andreas Apostolakis

Greek Orthodox Youth Association of America (GOYA) is an organized group of over fifty children aged 12 to 18, or 7th-12th grade. They meet on a monthly basis to discuss the many ongoing activities throughout the week. These include Basketball and Volleyball games and practices through the fall and winter, Greek dance practices and many more. Additionally, the GOYA is responsible for hosting fundraising events such as their yearly Taverna Night in December, which raises money for nonprofit organizations, as well as helping with the festival, which raises money for the church. The GOYA also has a yearly Olympic competition, where churches from all around New Jersey stay at Monmouth University during Memorial Day weekend to compete in Track and Field, Volleyball, Soccer and Swimming. The Soccer team won 2 championships in 2018 and 2019 led by now Junior Andreas Hadjiloucas who won the 2019 MVP award after making the game-winning goal.

=== Cross-diving ===
Instituted in Asbury Park in 1947 by the late Archbishop (and later Ecumenical Patriarch) Athenagoras, the 75-year-old tradition of the Blessing of the Waters and Κατάδυσις of the Cross, also known as the "Cross Dive," resumed on Sunday, September 18, 2022. Faithful from across the Metropolis of NJ joined Archbishop Elpidophoros of America, Bishop Apostolos of Medeia, Chancellor Archimandrite Christoforos Oikonomidis, and clergy from the Metropolis for Divine Liturgy in the Great Auditorium of Ocean Grove before heading down to the beach.

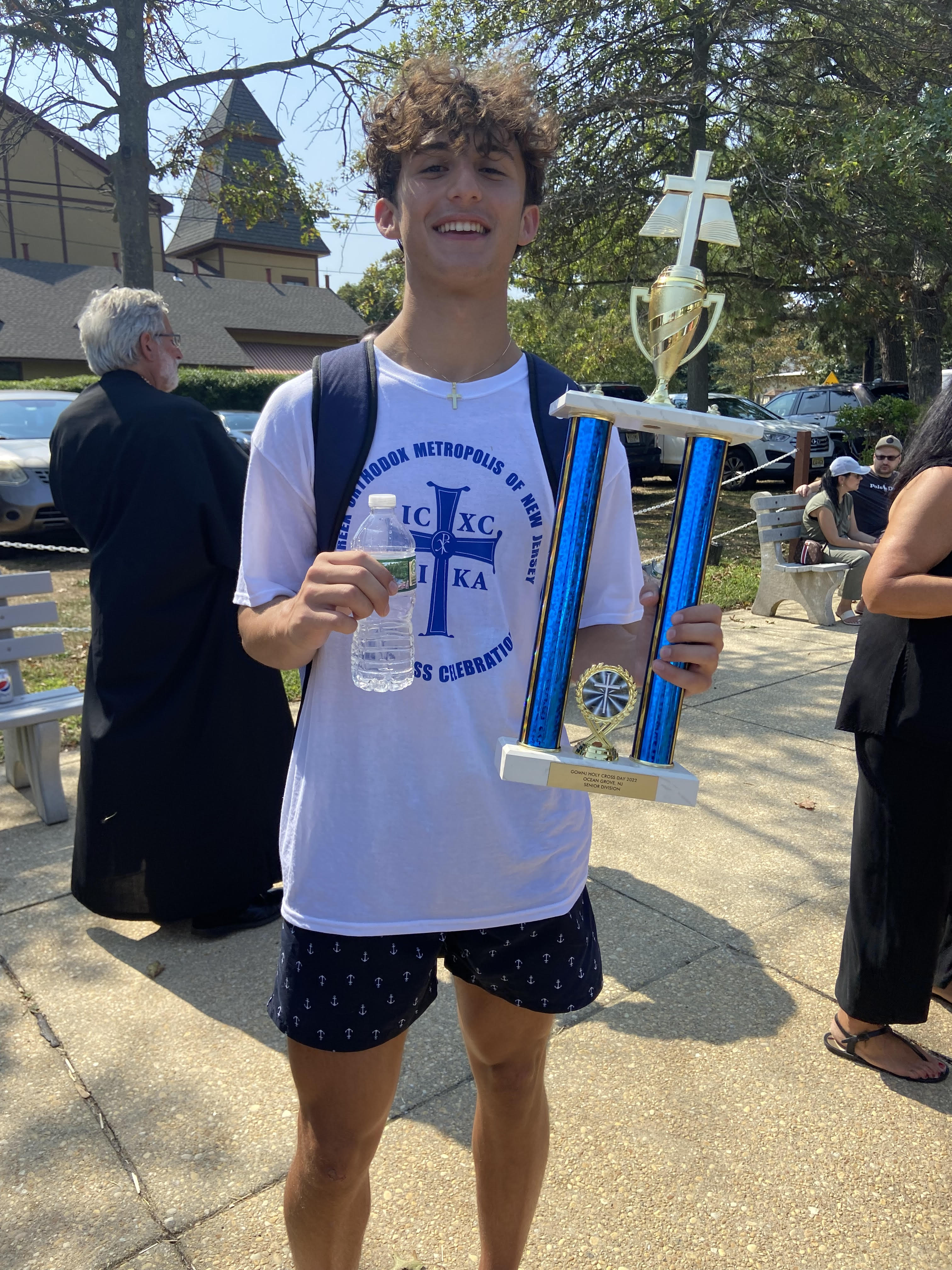
Chris Vlahos had the honor of representing St. George in the 'Diving of the Cross' Event in 2022

After the crosses were thrown in the water, Kosta Hantsoulis (Junior Boy) and Chris Vlahos (Senior Boy), both from Saint George in Piscataway, retrieved the Crosses.

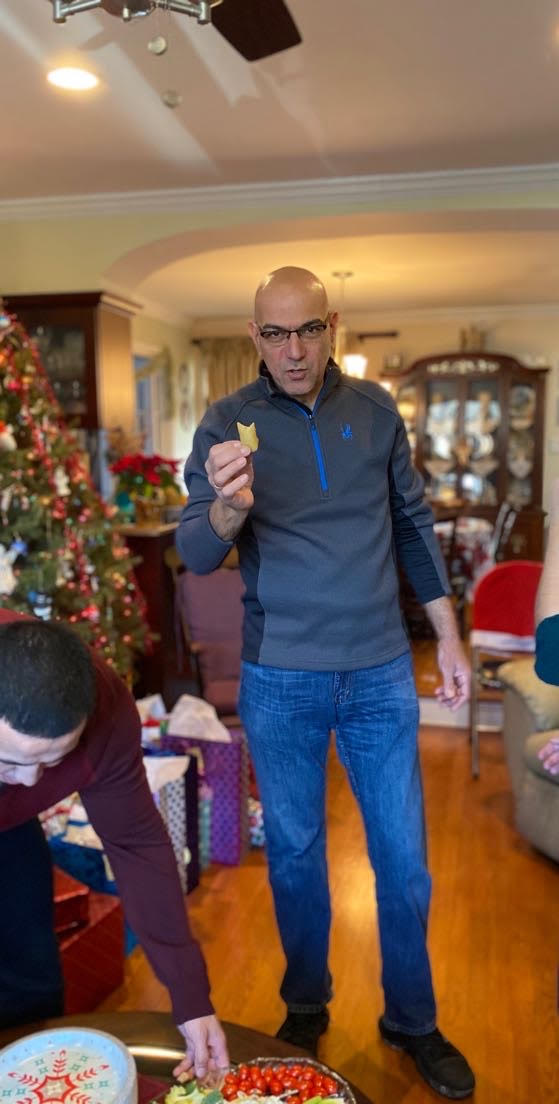
GOYA advisor George Hadjlioucas eating a piece of Cypriot Halloumi cheese at a Christmas party

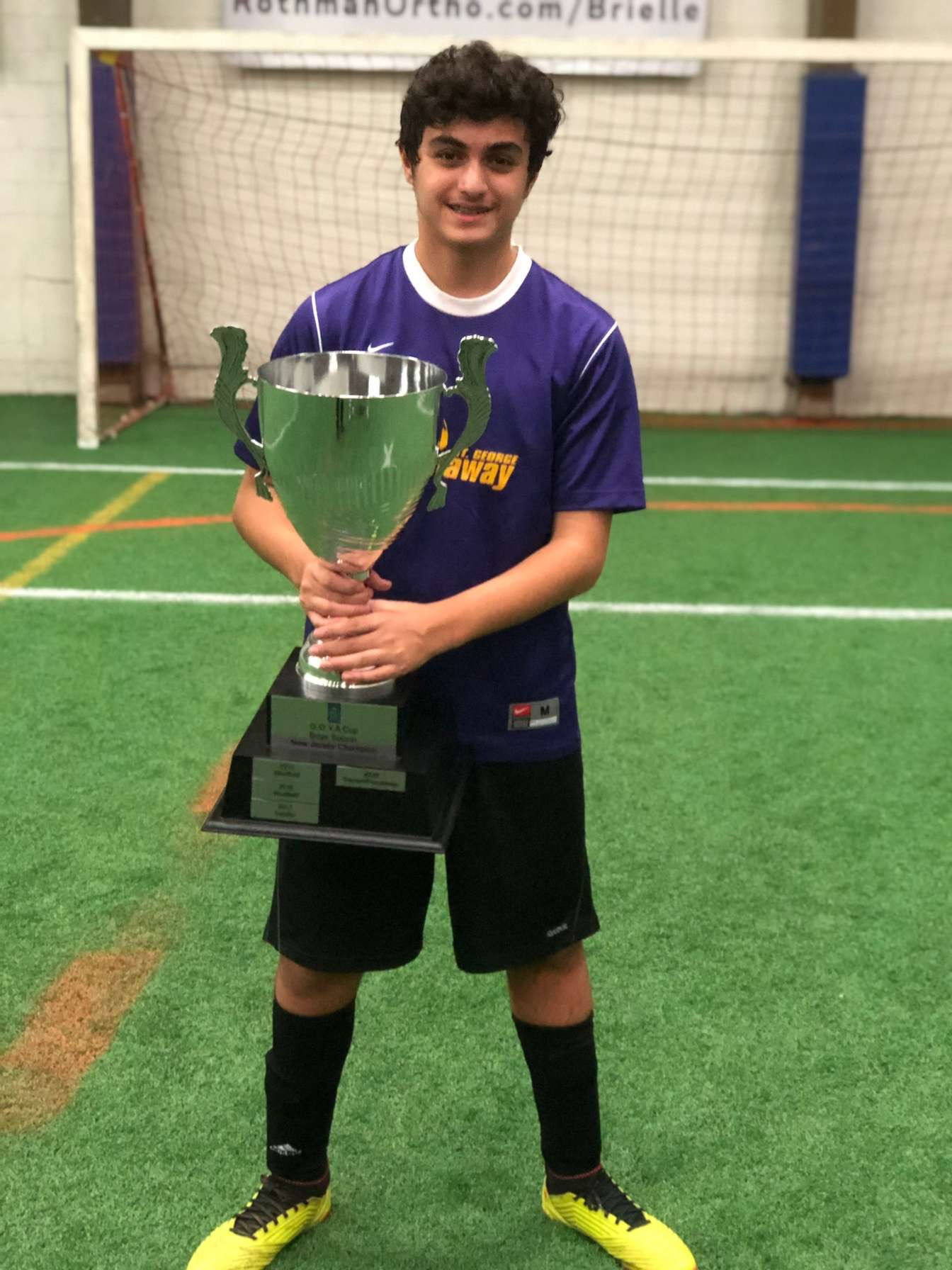
2019 GOYA soccer tournament MVP Andreas "Jaguar" Hadjiloucas with the first-place trophy

== See also ==
- Saint Demetrios Greek Orthodox Church (Jersey City, New Jersey)
