= Greek Orthodox Church of St. George (Des Moines, Iowa) =

- Greek Orthdodox Church of St. George
- U.S. National Register of Historic Places
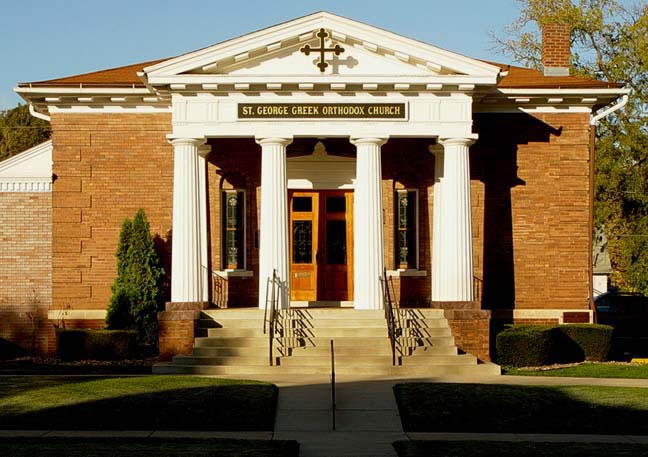
- East facade of the Greek Orthodox Church of St. George in Des Moines, Iowa

- Location within Iowa Location within the United States
- Location: 1110 35th Street; Des Moines, Iowa
- Coordinates: 41°35′56″N 93°39′52″W
- Built: 1906
- Architectural style: Classical Revival
- MPS: Architectural Legacy of Proudfoot & Bird in Iowa MPS
- NRHP reference No.: 97000101
- Added to NRHP: 1997-02-28

The Greek Orthodox Church of St. George in Des Moines, Iowa is a parish of the Greek Orthodox Archdiocese of America located in the Drake Neighborhood near Drake University. The building was listed on the National Register of Historic Places on February 28, 1997, as part of the architectural legacy of Proudfoot and Bird in Iowa.

== History ==
The church building was originally built as Elmwood United Presbyterian Church in 1906 in a Neoclassical architectural style. The Elmwood congregation included the family of Henry Cantwell Wallace, editor of Wallaces' Farmer and United States Secretary of Agriculture from 1921 to 1924. His son, Henry A. Wallace who would become Vice-President of the United States, was married in this church in 1914. In 1926, the Elmwood congregation merged with another Presbyterian church and sold the building to a Baptist church. The Baptists were unable to attract a congregation in the neighborhood and disbanded in 1930, returning the building to the merged Presbyterian congregation.

In 1924, the Greek community in Des Moines and central Iowa formed a kinotis, or Greek society. In 1928, the immigrants organized a Greek Orthodox parish named for St. George the Great Martyr, which held services with visiting priests on an irregular basis in rented spaces. In 1929, the parish fought U.S. immigration authorities to bring Fr. Meletios Kestekides from Greece to be its first regular priest.

In late 1930, the parish purchased the former Elmwood United Presbyterian Church building and immediately converted it into an Orthodox church by erecting an iconostasis in front of the altar. The parish held its first Divine Liturgy in the building on Christmas Day, 1930. Orthodox icons have been added to the interior over time, but the building retains many artifacts of the original Presbyterian congregation such as the stained glass windows. These windows preserve the names of their original donors.

In 1981 the parish hall was built adjacent to the church. On November 4, 1997, the Ecumenical Patriarch of Constantinople, Bartholomew I, visited St. George Parish. In 2005, the parish received its first Iowa-born priest, Fr. Basil Hickman, a native of Mason City, Iowa.

The parish currently lists 190 member families, consisting of families from traditionally Orthodox ethnic groups and converts to Orthodoxy from other ethnic backgrounds. Cultural events and educational programs sponsored by the parish include the Greek School for Children, a youth Sunday School program, active chapters of Greek Orthodox Youth of America (GOYA) and Junior Orthodox Youth (JOY), an adult Greek School, a monthly Adult Synaxis (the parish adult education program), a women's Bible study program, and an annual Greek Food Fair held during the first weekend in June. Most educational programs are open to the public, as are all services. The parish has an active Ladies' Philoptochos Society for charitable work. Members of the parish are also active in the Order of AHEPA and the Daughters of Penelope.
