= St. George's Greek Orthodox Church (Southbridge, Massachusetts) =

Historic church in Massachusetts, United States

- U.S. National Register of Historic Places
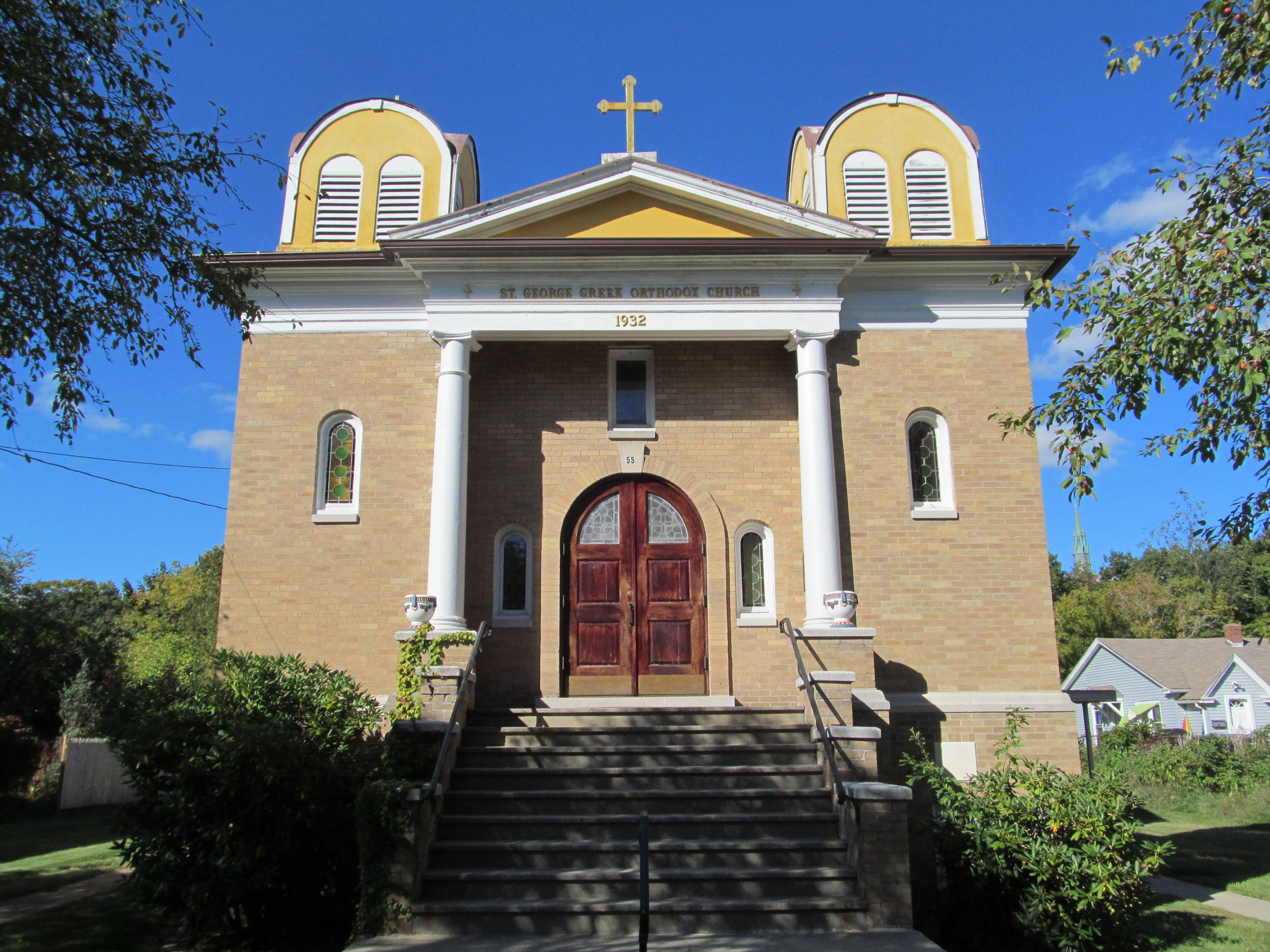
- St. Georges Greek Orthodox Church

- Location within Massachusetts Location within the United States
- Location: 55 North St., Southbridge, Massachusetts
- Coordinates: 42°4′36″N 72°1′48″W
- Area: less than one acre
- Built: 1932
- MPS: Southbridge MRA
- NRHP reference No.: 89000579
- Added to NRHP: June 22, 1989

St. George's Greek Orthodox Church is a historic Greek Orthodox Church building at 55 North Street in Southbridge, Massachusetts. Built in 1932, it is the oldest Orthodox church in the city, and is a locally rare example of Byzantine and Greek architecture. The church was listed on the National Register of Historic Places in 1989.

== Architecture and history ==
The church is located north of Southbridge's central business district, on the north side of North Street, about midway between Foster and Mechanic Streets. It is a single-story masonry structure, with a cruciform plan and a central cupola. The front (south-facing) facade is flanked by low square towers topped by rounded wood-frame stages that are terminated in crosses. The entrance, set between these towers, is flanked by replacement columns and topped by a full Greek entablature (the columns are a simpler replacement for ones that had Corinthian capitals). Windows are generally set in round-arch openings.

The Greek congregation was established in 1908 by immigrants who arrived to work at the American Optical Company, and at first met in private residences. The congregation's first church was built in 1910, but burned down in 1932. This church, built that same year on land purchased from the Hamilton Woolen Mill, is typical of other Greek Orthodox churches built in central Massachusetts around that time. It was designed by George Glynou and built by F. X. Laliberte and Sons. The bell, donated by the Hamilton Woolen Company, was made in 1860 in Troy, New York.

== See also ==
- National Register of Historic Places listings in Southbridge, Massachusetts
- National Register of Historic Places listings in Worcester County, Massachusetts
