= St. George Greek Orthodox Church, Asmara =

Greek Orthodox church in Asmara, Eritrea

St. George Greek Orthodox Church is a Greek Orthodox church building in Asmara. It was established in 1903 by the Greek trader community.
