= Marmus =

Marmus (Ukrainian: Мармус) is a Ukrainian surname. Notable people with this surname include:

- Vasyl Marmus (1992–2022), Ukrainian musician, actor, soldier
- Volodymyr Marmus (born 1949), Ukrainian public and political figure, participant in the national liberation struggle, writer, human rights activist. Founder and leader of the Rosokhach Group.
