= Vasyl Marmus =

Ukrainian musician, actor, serviceman (1992–2022)

- Василь Мармус
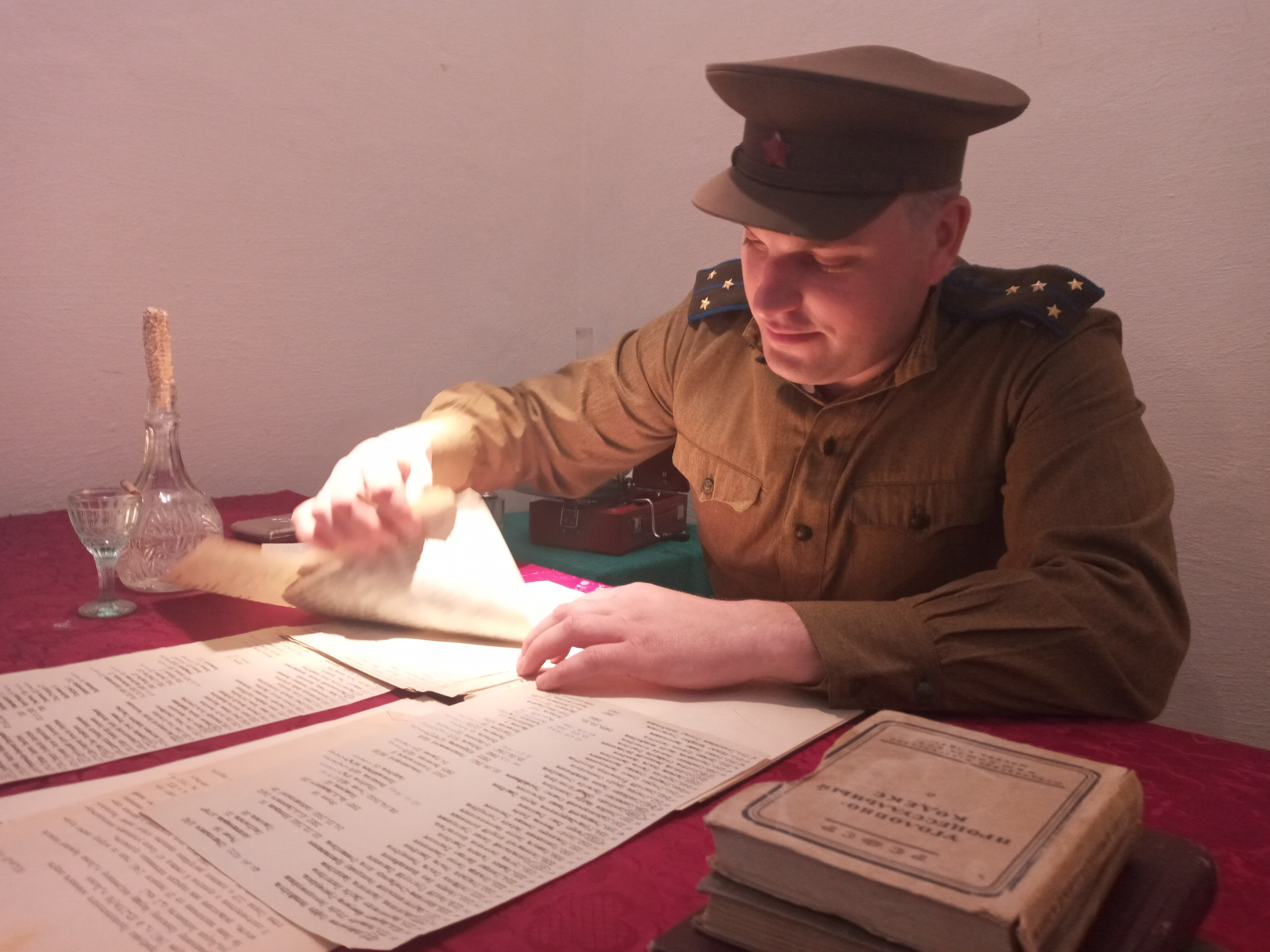
- Vasyl Marmus during the filming of the movie Mariia
- Born: Vasyl Volodymyrovych Marmus; April 26, 1992; Chortkiv, Ternopil Oblast
- Died: 11 September 2022 (aged 30); Oskil, Kharkiv Oblast
- Alma mater: Ternopil Volodymyr Hnatiuk National Pedagogical University
- Military career
- Allegiance: Ukraine
- Branch: Armed Forces of Ukraine
- Rank: Soldier
- Nickname: Muzykant (Музикант)
- Conflicts: Russo-Ukrainian War
- Awards: Order for Courage; Honorary Citizen of Chortkiv

Vasyl Volodymyrovych Marmus (Ukrainian: Василь Володимирович Мармус; 26 April 1992, Chortkiv, Ternopil Oblast — 11 September 2022, Oskil, Kharkiv Oblast, Ukraine) was a Ukrainian musician, actor, serviceman, soldier of the 80th Air Assault Brigade of the Armed Forces of Ukraine, a participant in the Russian-Ukrainian war. Son of a well-known Ukrainian dissident, member of the Rosokhach Group, Volodymyr Marmus.

== Biography ==
Vasyl Marmus was born on 26 April 1992 in Chortkiv, Ternopil Oblast.

Marmus studied at the Chortkiv Music School and secondary school No. 5, graduated from the Prykarpatskyi Military and Sports Boarding Lyceum, Ternopil Volodymyr Hnatiuk National Pedagogical University.

He was an active participant in the Revolution of Dignity.

With the beginning of the Russian invasion of Ukraine in 2022, Marmus went to the front as a volunteer. He served with the 80th air assault brigade of the Armed Forces of Ukraine. He died on 11 September 2022 in Oskil, Kharkiv Oblast.

He was buried on 15 September 2022 on the Alley of Heroes of the Yahilnytskyi Cemetery in Chortkiv.

He is survived by his parents, wife, daughter, and a brother.

== Creativity ==
He played many instruments, including the accordion, bandura, harmonica, and was an excellent trombone player. He was a member of the band "Oktava", for which he wrote the Christmas carol "Sviata Nich".

He was a member of the Ternopil Film Commission (2021, dreamed of creating a branch in Chortkiv). He played the role of an Enkavedist in the national non-fiction film Mariia (2021).

In 2022, before the invasion, Vasyl dedicated the song Braty po nevoli to his father Volodymyr.

== Awards ==
- Order for Courage, 3rd class (28 September 2023, posthumously)
- Honorary Citizen of Chortkiv (2022, posthumously)

== Commemorating the memory ==
On 13 October 2022, a memorial evening was held in memory of Vasyl Marmus at the Kateryna Rubchakova Cultural Services Center in Chortkiv.

In June 2023, the Chortkiv Art School was named after him. On 4 September of the same year, a bas-relief to Vasyl Marmus was unveiled on the facade of the school, created by artists from Kyiv, Olha and Yakiv Bilenko.
