= List of honorary citizens of Chortkiv =

Honorary citizens of the city of Chortkiv, Ternopil Oblast

List of honorary citizens of the city of Chortkiv, Ternopil Oblast.

Honorary citizens:

1. Ludwik Noss, mayor of Chortkiv (1896)
2. Stanislav Bodnar, district starosta (1909)
3. Liubomyr Bilyk, Ukrainian scientist, physician, teacher, director of the Chortkiv Medical College (2013)
4. Myroslav Motiuk, Ukrainian doctor, lawyer, businessman, public figure (2013)
5. Volodymyr Hubitskyi, Ukrainian public figure (2013)
6. Yukhym Makoterskyi, Ukrainian businessman, local historian, public figure (2013)
7. о. Hryhorii Kanak, Ukrainian religious and public figure (2014)
8. о. Mykhailo Levkovych, Ukrainian religious leader (2014)
9. Stefan Hrytskiv, Ukrainian orthopedic trauma surgeon, public figure, publicist (2014)
10. Petro Dzyndra, Ukrainian sculptor, public figure (2014)
11. Yaromyr Chorpita, Ukrainian historian, local historian, teacher (2014)
12. Roman Iliashenko, Ukrainian soldier (2015, posthumously)
13. Stepan Demianchuk, Ukrainian scientist and teacher (2015)
14. Halyna Hrytskiv, Ukrainian public figure, poet, publicist (2015)
15. Bohdan Havrylyshyn, Ukrainian, Canadian and Swiss economist, public figure, philanthropist, full member of the Club of Rome (2016)
16. Mykhailo Kaskiv, Ukrainian educator, businessman (2016)
17. Ihor Andriishyn, Ukrainian teacher-methodologist of the highest category (2017)
18. Valerii Bolshakov, Ukrainian athletics coach (2017)
19. Orest Lyzhechka, Ukrainian photographer, photojournalist (2018)
20. Volodymyr Marmus, Ukrainian public and political figure, writer (2019)
21. Borys Mirus, Ukrainian actor (2019)
22. Mykola Budenkevych, employee of a utility company (2019, posthumously)
23. Andrii Bazalinskyi, Ukrainian poet, teacher, local historian (2019)
24. Petro Holinatyi, Ukrainian choir master conductor (2019)
25. Andrii Kunyk, Ukrainian soldier (2020)
26. Bohdan Chyzhyshyn, Ukrainian radiologist (2020)
27. Serhii Basistyi, Ukrainian soldier, soldier (2022, posthumously)
28. Ruslan Bortsov, Ukrainian soldier (2022, posthumously)
29. Andrii Hladii, Ukrainian soldier (2022, posthumously)
30. Denys Hromovyi, Ukrainian soldier (2022, posthumously)
31. Serhii Marushchak, Ukrainian soldier (2022, posthumously)
32. Nazar Makhnevych, Ukrainian soldier (2022, posthumously)
33. Volodymyr Myronchuk, pensioner, former head of Chortkiv Raion (2022)
34. Serhii Myskiv, Ukrainian soldier (2022, posthumously)
35. Leonid Pidruchnyi, Ukrainian soldier, deputy chief of the military commissar of the Kremenets Raion territorial center for recruitment and social support (2022)
36. Omelian Reshetar, pensioner, mayor of Chortkiv in 1977-1982 (2022)
37. Roman Rushchak, Ukrainian soldier (2022, posthumously)
38. Oleh Uruskyi, former Vice Prime Minister of Ukraine, Director of Development at Progresstech Ukraine (2022)
39. Petro Fedoryshyn, editor-in-chief of the "Vilne Zhyttia" newspaper, author of a three-volume publication on the history of Chortkiv ("Light and Shadows of Chortkiv Castles", 2019; "Secrets of the Sadovskyi Treasures", 2021; "In the Whirlwind of Time", 2022) (2022)
40. Volodymyr Chmil, Ukrainian soldier (2022, posthumously)
41. Ihor Shtunyk, Ukrainian soldier (2022, posthumously)
42. Andrii Balyk, Ukrainian soldier (2022, posthumously)
43. Vasyl Zhybchuk, Ukrainian soldier (2022, posthumously)
44. Nazar Kyryliuk, Ukrainian soldier (2022, posthumously)
45. Vasyl Marmus, Ukrainian soldier (2022, posthumously)
46. Vitalii Mykuliak, Ukrainian soldier (2022, posthumously)
47. Ihor Roschis, Ukrainian soldier (2022, posthumously)
48. Andrii Skurzhanskyi, Ukrainian soldier (2022, posthumously)
49. Bohdan Striletskyi, Ukrainian soldier (2022, posthumously)
50. Roman Kholodiuk, Ukrainian soldier (2022, posthumously)
51. Chuck Schumer, American politician serving as Senate Majority Leader since 2021 and the senior United States senator from New York (2024)
