= Kateryna Rubchakova =

Ukrainian actress and singer (1881–1919)

- Катерина Рубчакова
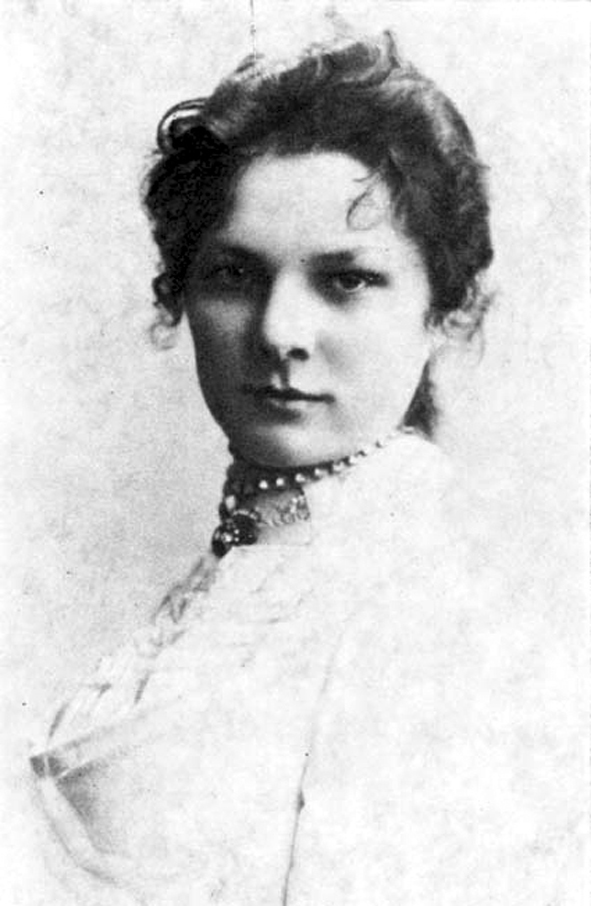
- Kateryna Rubchakova
- Born: 29 April 1881; Chortkiv, Austria-Hungary (now Ukraine)
- Died: 22 November 1919 (aged 38); Zinkivtsi (now Kamianets-Podilskyi urban hromada, Khmelnytskyi Oblast, Ukraine)
- Occupations: Actress; singer

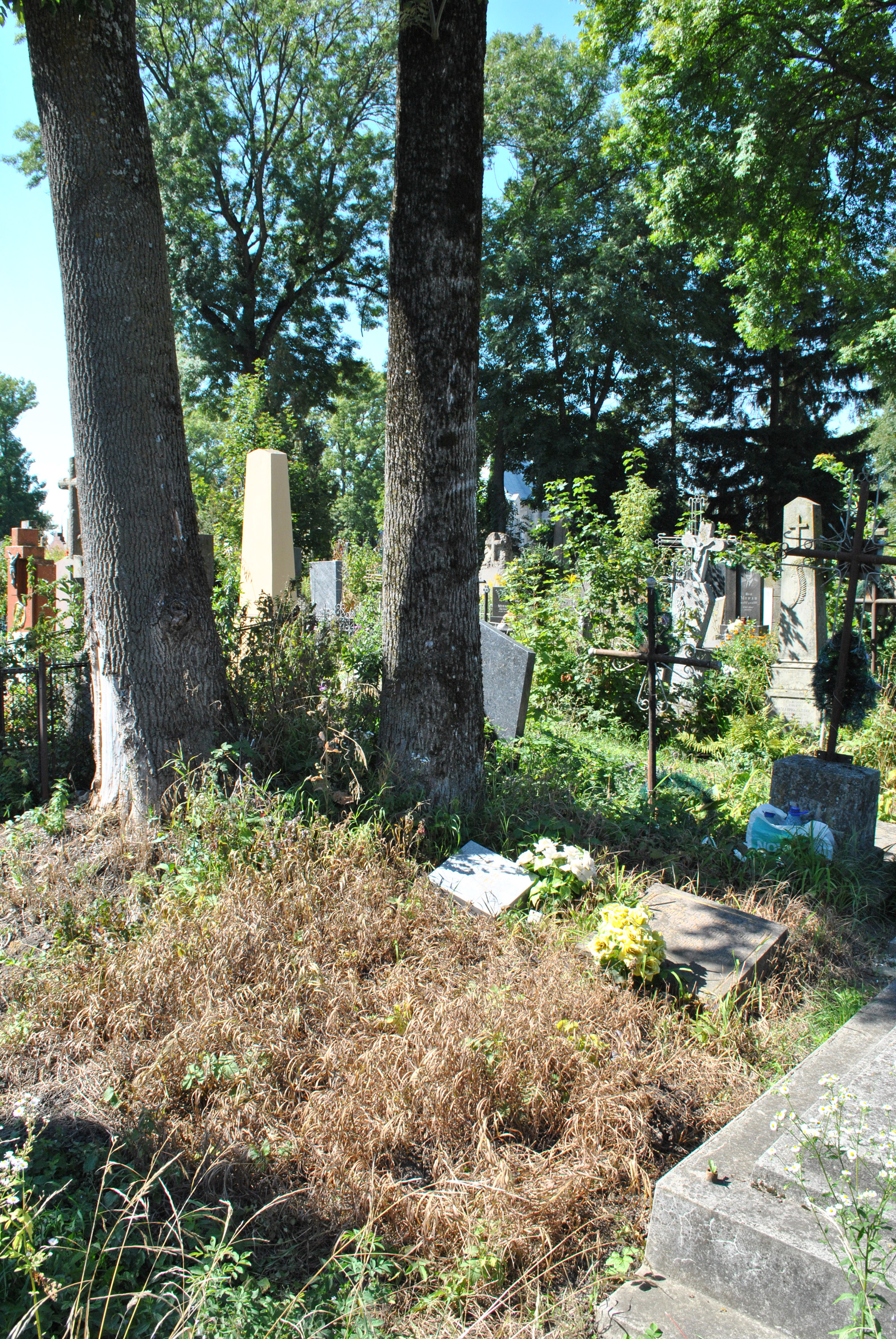
The graves of artists Teodosiia Bentsaleva and Kateryna Rubchakova at the Mykulynetskyi cemetery

Kateryna Andriivna Rubchakova (Ukrainian: Катерина Андріївна Рубчакова, née Kossak; 29 April 1881 – 22 November 1919) was a Ukrainian actress of universal transformation and a singer in lyrical soprano. Prima donna of the Galician Theater.

== Biography ==
Kateryna Rubchakova was born on 29 April 1881 in Chortkiv to a deacon and amateur conductor of the city choir, Andrii Kossak (1850–1917), the son of a blacksmith and weaver Ivan Kossak from the village of Bila near Chortkiv, and his wife Rozaliia Hryhorivna Fedorovych (1856–1923), the daughter of peasants from Vyhnanka.

Studied at people's school in Chortkiv, where she first performed in the choir. She began her stage career under the direction of Stepan Yanovych and Kost' Pidvysotskyi. Study at the music and drama studio at the theater under the direction of Yosyp Stadnyk, and singing – with S. Kozlovska (1901–1902).

In 1886–1914, she worked at the Ukrainska Besida Theatre in Lviv (1917–1918 – director), and in 1916–1918 she headed the troupe of the Streletskyi Theater.

In 1918–1919 she played at the Ukrainian Theater of Mykola Bentsal in Ternopil; from 1919 she worked at the Chernivtsi Ukrainian Drama Theater and the New Lviv Theater, which toured the cities of Galicia, Bukovyna, and Podillia (Ternopil, Chortkiv, Borshchiv, Kopychyntsi, and others).

She performed on stage with Amvrosii Buchma, Maria Zankovetska, Marian Krushelnytskyi, Les Kurbas, Antonina Osypovych, Mykola Sadovskyi, Vasyl and Hanna Yurchak, and others.

She died on 22 November 1919 from typhus in Zinkivtsi, now Khmelnytskyi Oblast, Ukraine. In 1958, thanks to the efforts of her daughter Olha, she was reburied at the Mykulynetskyi cemetery in Ternopil next to the grave of actress Teodoziia Bentsaleva.

=== Family ===
Kateryna Rubchakova was the sister of Antonina Diakova, Vasyl and Mykhailo Kossak, and Mariia Kostiv-Kossakivna.

On 28 January 1899, in Rohatyn, she married singer Ivan Rubchak. Mother of actresses Yaroslava, Olha, and Nadiia Rubchakivna, mother-in-law of Hnat Yura.

== Roles ==
She has played 79 dramatic, 27 operetta, and 18 opera roles, among others:

- "Nazar Stodolia" Taras Shevchenko's,
- "Tsyhanka Aza", "Oi ne khody, Hrytsiu...", Marusia Bohuslavka Mykhailo Starytsky's,
- "Khaziaïn" Ivan Karpenko-Kary's,
- "Chorna pantera i bilyi vedmid'" Volodymyr Vynnychenko's,
- "Ghosts" Henrik Ibsen's,
- "Les Romanesques" Edmond Rostand's,
- "Liebelei" Arthur Schnitzler's,
- "Mirele Efros" Jacob Gordin's.

The best opera roles:

- "Zaporozhian Cossack beyond the Danube" Semen Hulak-Artemovsky's,
- "Kateryna" Mykola Arkas's,
- "Enei na mandrivtsi" Yaroslav Y. Lopatynsky's,
- "Faust" Charles Gounod's,
- "Tales of Hoffman" Johann Offenbach's,
- "Madame Butterfly" Giacomo Puccini's,
- "Halka" Stanisław Moniuszko's.

The theatre director Stepan Charnetskyi wrote about her performance as Ryta in Vynnychenko's drama: "Rubchakova came to the fore among the performers, who, playing the Black Panther, was especially famous in Act II...".

== Commemoration ==
In 1981, the centenary of Rubchakova's birth was celebrated under the auspices of UNESCO. In 1989, in Kyiv, Petro Medvedyk published the book "Kateryna Rubchakova".

In Chortkiv, a house of culture was named in Rubchakova's honor and a bust was erected (1991, sculpted by Dmytro Stetsko). The local history museum has an exhibition dedicated to her. She also has streets named in her honor in Khmelnytskyi, Chortkiv, Borshchiv, and Nahirianka.

== Sources ==
- Історія вокального мистецтва / О. Д. Шуляр: [монографія]: Ч. ІІ, Івано-Франківськ, «Плай» 2012, С. 280–281.
- Коссак-Рубчакова Катерина Андріївна // Українська музична енциклопедія. У 2 т. Т. 2. [Е – К] / гол. редкол. Г. Скрипник, Київ : Видавництво Інституту мистецтвознавства, фольклористики та етнології НАН України, 2008, s. 562.
- Рубчакова Катерина Андріївна // Шевченківська енциклопедія : у 6 т. / Гол. ред. М. Г. Жулинський. — Київ : Ін-т літератури ім. Т. Г. Шевченка, 2015, Т. 5 : Пе—С, s. 572.
- Пахолюк, В. Беля, А. Чортків у постатях. Рубчакова Катерина // Світло і тіні чортківських замків (Сторінками історії міста (XI-XVIII ст.). Книга перша / П. С. Федоришин, Тернопіль : Терно-граф, 2019, s. 265, ISBN 978-966-457-355-6.
