= Dovzhok =

Dovzhok may refer to several places in Ukraine:

- Dovzhok, Kamianets-Podilskyi Raion, a village in the Kamianets-Podilskyi Raion (district) of Khmelnytskyi Oblast
- Dovzhok, Chernivtsi Oblast, a commune (selsoviet) in Chernivtsi Raion, Chernivtsi Oblast
- Dovzhok, Nemyriv Raion, a village in the Nemyriv Raion, Vinnytsia Oblast
- Dovzhok, Pohrebyshche Raion, a village in the Pohrebyshche Raion, Vinnytsia Oblast
- Dovzhok, Sharhorod Raion, a village in the Sharhorod Raion, Vinnytsia Oblast
- Dovzhok, Yampil Raion, a village in the Yampil Raion, Vinnytsia Oblast
- Dovzhok, Poltava Oblast, a village in the Zinkiv Raion of Poltava Oblast
