= Ludwik Noss =

Austrian public and educational figure (1848–1913)

- Людвіг Носс
- Born: Ludwik Noss; 25 January 1848; Chortkiv, Austrian Empire
- Died: 7 September 1913 (aged 65); Lviv, Austria-Hungary
- Education: University of Vienna

Ludwik Noss (Ukrainian: Людвіг Носс; 25 January 1848, in Chortkiv, Austrian Empire – 7 September 1913, in Lviv, Austria-Hungary) was an Austrian government official, philanthropist, public and educational figure. He was an imperial counselor, burgomaster of Chortkiv.

== Biography ==
Ludwik Noss was born on 25 January 1848 in Chortkiv in the Austrian Empire to a pharmacist. He was baptized on 8 February. His godparents were Heronim Sadovskyi and Barbara Bushynska.

On 1 May 1863, Ludwik Noss officially started working in his father's pharmacy. In 1866, he passed the exam before the pharmacy commission with flying colors and was enrolled in a 3-year professional practice, and later became an assistant (1866—1869) at the pharmacy.

He attended school at the Chortkiv Dominican Monastery. After graduation, he became a co-owner of his father's pharmacy. He graduated from the nobleman's convivium (1866) and the state gymnasium (1868) in Ternopil. He received a master's degree in pharmacy from the University of Vienna (1871). After his studies, he returned to Chortkiv, where he owned a monopoly pharmacy (now Aptechna Street, 4) and was engaged in pharmacy business.

He worked as a cashier (1875—1877, 1884–1887) in the city government of Chortkiv. In 1883, 1888—1913 he was the burgomaster of Chortkiv.

While in this position, he built the Rudkova Balka water intake (1901) and founded a women's seminary (1908); built a new church on the site of the old one, the city hall with a clock tower, the premises of the powiat, county, and city courts, a bank, the premises of the railway station, pharmacies, the premises of the Polish gymnastic society "Sokil", a post office, etc.; Mickiewicza, Rynok, and Koliiova streets were paved.

On 3 July 1887, he headed a delegation from the Chortkiv Powiat Council that took part in celebrations at the Lviv courtyard on the occasion of the arrival of Crown Prince Rudolf of Austria to Galicia. He personally greeted the emperor on behalf of the Chortkiv delegation. And then he accompanied the distinguished guests to Chortkiv. On 7 July of the same year, Crown Prince Rudolf arrived in the city to inspect the newly built railway yards (station buildings).

In September 1906, he ordered the gendarmes to destroy leaflets posted around the city that spoke of the disruption of the elections in the Exile and criticized the Austrian electoral system.

Member of the c.-c. Member of the Chortkiv school powiat council, Buchach-Chortkiv-Zalishchyky department of the Galician Economic Society in Lviv (Galicyjskie Towarzystwo Gospodarskie we Lwowie; 1882–1887, 1888), the Stanisław Staszyc Society (1889), the representative body of the city communes (1889). Stanisław Staszyc (1889); representative of the city gmina (1885—1913), a branch of the representative body (1891—1894, 1905–1913) and deputy member of the branch (1885—1890, 1898–1904) of the Chortkiv Powiat Council; Secondary School Association (1909, 1910, 1911, 1912).

He was engaged in education and patronage, in particular, he supported all religious denominations and churches in Chortkiv. He promoted the organization of evenings in memory of poets, including Adam Mickiewicz. He was interested in the development of architecture, painting, and literature.

Noss was fluent in German, Polish, Ukrainian, and knew Latin.

Noss died on 7 September 1913 in a Lviv hotel. He was buried on 11 September 1913 in Chortkiv. In 1995, when representatives of the Polish state made the "Description of topographic graves in the cemetery in Chortkiv", the seventh grave of Noss was listed in the second sector of the cemetery under number seven. In 2020, Petro Fedoryshyn and others tried in vain to find it, but later found and restored it.

== Awards ==
- Honorary citizen of Chortkiv (1896)
- Golden Cross of Merit with a crown (1897)
- Order of Franz Joseph, III class (1912)

== Memory ==
One of Chortkiv's streets is named after Ludwik Noss.
