= Vasyl Hovika =

Ukrainian lirnyk (1904–1993)

- Василь Говіка
- Born: 1 January 1904; Rosokhach, now Volyn Oblast, Ukraine
- Died: 23 March 1993 (aged 89); Winnipeg, Canada

Vasyl Hovika (Ukrainian: Василь Говіка; 1 January 1904 – 23 March 1993) is a Ukrainian lirnyk. In the 1950s–1980s, Hovika was the only promoter of lirnykism on the American continent. Member of the Ukrainian National Federation of Canada.

== Biography ==
Vasyl Hovika was born on 1 January 1904, in Rosokhach, now the Chortkiv urban hromada in the Chortkiv Raion, Ternopil Oblast, Ukraine. Father of Mariia Pidkovych.

In 1938, he emigrated to Canada. Served in the Canadian Army during the World War II.

Hovika founded his own company. An active participant in the social and cultural life of Ukrainians in Canada. Hovika has performed at concerts and performances, celebrations in Toronto, Ottawa, Alberta and other cities in Canada, as well as in the US, including Detroit, where there is a bandura chapel. Hovika has been accompanied by soloists and groups.

Died on 23 March 1993 in Winnipeg.

== Awards ==
In 1973, Hovika received the highest award at the National Ukrainian Festival in Canada, where he performed with his grandson.

== Honoring ==
Art historians V. Moroz and M. Bandera created the documentary film V. Hovika from Winnipeg.

A large number of publications about Hovika are kept at the Ukrainian National Association in Winnipeg and the Ottawa Public Museum.
