= Dmytro Stetsko =

Ukrainian painter, sculptor (1943–2017)

- Дмитро Григорович Стецько
- Born: 11 August 1943; Płonna, now Podkarpackie Voivodeship, Poland
- Died: 6 January 2017 (aged 73); Ternopil
- Education: Lviv School of Applied and Decorative Arts
- Occupations: Painter, graphic artist, sculptor

Dmytro Stetsko (Ukrainian: Дмитро Григорович Стецько; 8 November 1943, Płonna, now Podkarpackie Voivodeship, Poland – 6 January 2017, Ternopil) was a Ukrainian painter, graphic artist, sculptor. Husband of Vira Stetsko. From 1990 to 1993, he was a member of the National Union of Artists of Ukraine.

== Biography ==
In 1971, he graduated from the Lviv School of Applied and Decorative Arts (teachers T. Drahan and V. Trofymliuk). From 1971 to 2003, he worked as an artist at the Ternopil Artistic and Production Combine. From 2003, he has been engaged in creative work.

== Creativity ==
Stetsko was a multifaceted master who worked in various fields of art: from easel painting (he created portraits, landscapes, and narrative canvases, often on historical themes) to monumental art, as well as graphic art and sculpture.

His works are distinguished by a deep philosophical understanding of the chosen theme. In his work, he constantly returned to reflections on the historical path and fate of the Ukrainian people. At the same time, form, line, and color in his compositions are not just artistic means, but are filled with powerful symbolic meaning.

Stetsko is also known as the author of several significant monuments created in the early 1990s. In particular, he is the creator of:

- The monument to actress and singer Kateryna Rubchakova (installed in the city of Chortkiv in the Ternopil Oblast, 1991).
- Monuments to Vasyl Stus and Ivan Franko (both unveiled in Ternopil, 1993).

In 1990, he became the organizer and first chairman of the Khoruhva art association. In 1976, he began to present his works at national and international exhibitions. Solo exhibitions were held in Kyiv (1989, 2000–2001, 2010), Lviv (1989, 1999, 2010), Toronto (Canada, 1995), Khmelnytskyi (1996, 2008, 2013), Kaniv (Cherkasy Oblast, 2000), Odesa (2001), Ivano-Frankivsk (2008), Lutsk, and Rivne (both in 2010). Some of his works are kept in the collections of the National Art Museum of Ukraine (Kyiv), the Andrey Sheptytsky National Museum of Lviv, the Borys Voznytsky Lviv National Art Gallery, the Lviv Literary and Memorial Museum of I. Franko, the State Museum of T. Shevchenko (Kaniv), the Ternopil and Rivne Local History Museums, the Museum-Reserve Museum of Hetman of Ukraine I. Vyhovskyi (village of Ruda, Lviv Oblast), Ivano-Frankivsk, Khmelnytskyi, and Odesa Fine Arts Museum, Gallery 36 (Kyiv), and the Canadian-Ukrainian Art Foundation Gallery (Toronto).

== Awards ==
- Mykhailo Boichuk Prize.

== Honoring his memory ==
Stetsko's creative work was recognized by the media: in 2009, the TV channel "Kultura" released a documentary film about him entitled "Avanhard. Dmytro Stetsko".

In honor of his memory and contribution, a joint star dedicated to Dmytro and Vira Stetsko was unveiled on the Walk of Fame in Ternopil in 2017.

Among the main works:

- painting — series: "Pory roku" (1974–1975), "Sonata Chiurlionisu" (1978), "Selianski fresky" (1983), "Pradavni skryzhali" (2008), "Zamky Ukrainy" (2011); "Cheremshyna" (1978), "Materynstvo" (1979), "Vikhy istorii", "Baida" (both — 1982), "Kniaz Volodymyr" (1984), "Rozpriazhenyi viz" (1985), "Avtoportret", "T. Shevchenko", "I. Franko", "Lesia Ukrainka" (all — 1986), "Kniahynia Olha", "Zmiiebortsi" (both — 1987), "Manekeny" (1988), "Postskryptum" (1989), "Bii pid Berestechkom", "Blahovishchennia" (both — 1990), "M. Boichuk", "Roksolana", "Yordan" (both — 1991), "Vasylko, kniaz Terebovlianskyi" (1992), "Ta vzhe chovna moho nesut" (1993), "Apostol", "Poshtovyi anhel", "A. Vedel", "Auktsion biloi iamy", "Kreidianyi misiats" (all — 1994), "M. Berezovskyi", "D. Bortnianskyi" (both — 1995), "Lemkivski porohy" (1996), "Skify tsarski", "Anhel sushyt kryla" (all — 1996), "Proza" (1998), "Anhel-vesliar", "Verbna nedilia" (both — 2002), "Prymirka tsviakhamy" (2003), "Vtracheni znamena", "B.-I. Antonych" (all — 2003), "Korol", "Kamianyi peizazh", "De zh vy, striltsi sichovii?" (all — 2004), "Khortytsia", "Hetman I. Vyhovskyi" (both — 2006);
- sculptural compositions — "Doroha" (1981), "Odyn iz sotni", "Zhorno z-pid Berestechka" (both — 1989).

== Bibliography ==
- Стецько Дмитро Григорович // Шевченківська енциклопедія : у 6 т. / Гол. ред. М. Г. Жулинський. — Київ : Ін-т літератури ім. Т. Г. Шевченка, 2015. — Т. 5 : Пе—С. — С. 955.
- Encyclopedia of Ukraine. — Торонто, Буфало, Лондон, 1993.
- Виставка творів живопису Дмитра Стецька [Текст] : каталог / упоряд. В. Стецько. – Тернопіль : Збруч, 1989. – 24 с.
- Стецько Д. Ангел-весляр // Образотворче мистецтво. – 2007. – No. 3. – С. 102.
- Україна від Трипілля до сьогодення в образах сучасних художників / авт. О. Мельник. – [б. м.] : Софія А, 2004. – 108 с. – Текст укр., англ. мовами.
- Шот М. Колесо долі Дмитра Стецька // Урядовий кур'єр. — 2002. — 10 серпня.
- Шот М. Тихий смуток душі / Микола Шот. — Тернопіль: Воля, 2003. — С. 281–284;
- Кравченко Я. Школа Михайла Бойчука. Тридцять сім імен. — Київ: Майстерня книги, Оранта, 2010.
- Пан-Україна. Друге Міжнародне бієнале українського сучасного мистецтва. — Дніпропетровськ, 1995.
- Українське мистецтво ХХ сторіччя. — Київ, 1998.
