= Płonna, Podkarpackie Voivodeship =

Lemko village in Poland

Płonna Полонна
- village
- Location within Poland
- Coordinates: 49°25′57″N 22°06′15″E
- Country: Poland
- Voivodeship: Subcarpathian
- County: Sanok
- Gmina: Bukowsko
- Established: 1433

Area
  - Total: 68.8 km^{2} (26.6 sq mi)
- Elevation: 2.6 m (8.5 ft)

Population
  - Total: 20
- Time zone: UTC+1 (CET)
  - Summer (DST): UTC+2 (CEST)
- Postal code: 38500 (Bukowsko)

Płonna [ˈpwɔnːa] is a village in eastern Lesser Poland in the Lesser Beskid mountains, Bukowsko rural commune, located near the towns of Medzilaborce and Palota (in northeastern Slovakia).

Płonna is about 10 mi (16 km) from Sanok in south-eastern Poland. It is situated below the main watershed at the foot of the Słonne Mountain, and has an elevation of 340 m (1,115 ft). Since 1999 it is situated in the Subcarpathian Voivodship (province); previously in Krosno Voivodship (1975–1998) and Sanok district, (10 mi (16 km) east of Sanok), parish Bukowsko.

== History ==
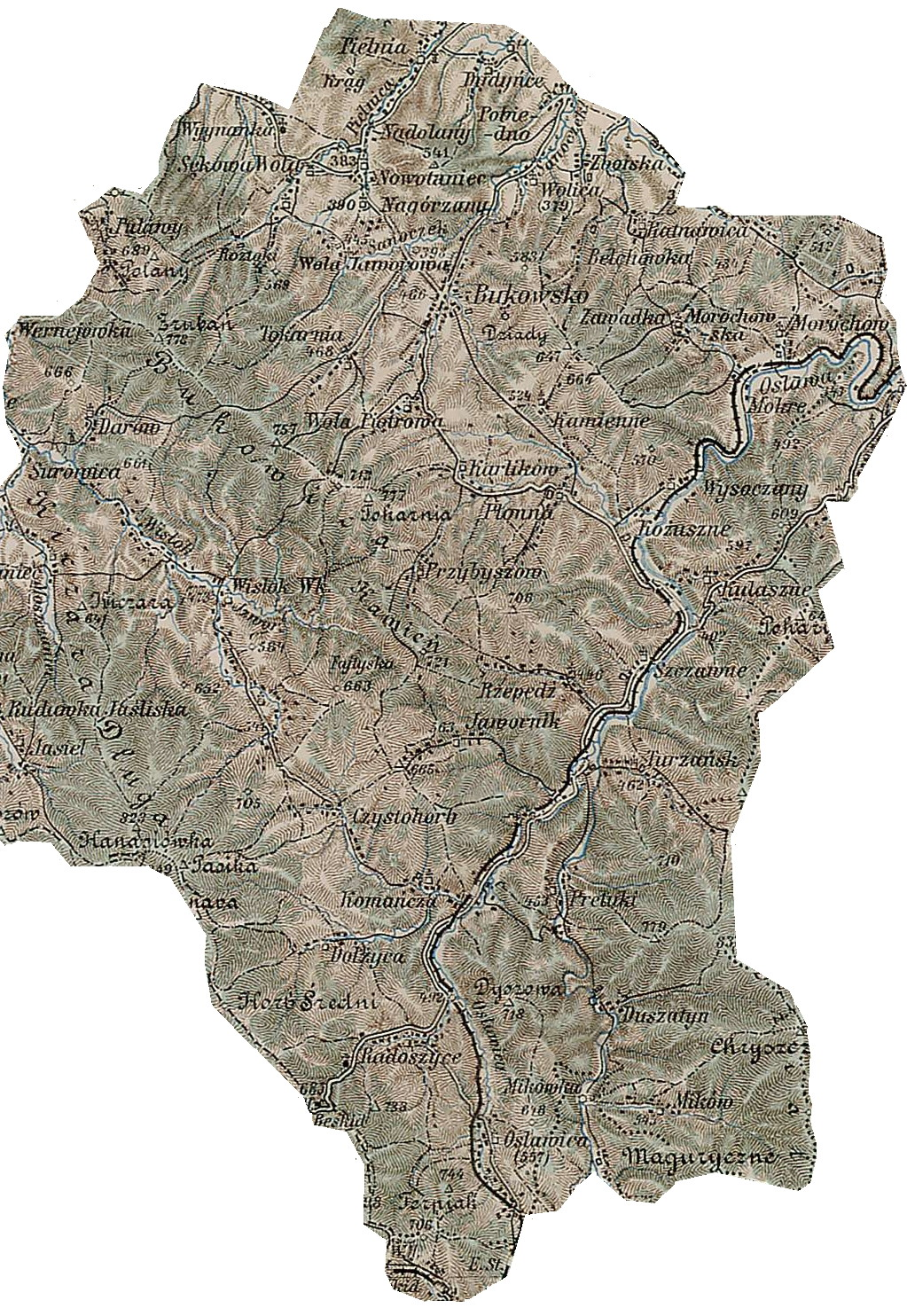
Gerichts-Bezirk ( Bukowsko Rural Commune) Bukowsko bis 1918. An 1898 map shows the location of Płonna (click in it to enlarge).

Płonna was founded in 1433 by Bal. During 966–1018, 1340–1772 (Ruthenian Voivodeship) and 1918–1939 Płonna was part of Poland. During 1772–1918 it belonged to the Austrian empire, and later the Austrian-Hungarian empire when double monarchy was introduced in Austria. In 1785 the village lands comprised 18.93 km^{2} (7.31 sq mi). Prior to the Second World War, the village was populated by a majority of Lemko Greek Catholics, and some Jewish families. In Spring, 1946, the village was burned by the Polish Communist Army for the Polish government (PKWN), and all villagers that the Polish Army could locate were forcibly deported. In 1947, during Akcja Wisla (Operation Vistula), the remainder of Lemkos who were not previously sent to Soviet Ukraine were finally captured and deported to former German territories that Poland had acquired as a provision of the Yalta Conference. Their land plots were joined to form a collective farm, the remains of which still remain in the village, and the church was turned into a barn.

The church at Płonna is on the main road and easily accessible. Filial churches were located in Wysoczany (4.5 km or 2.8 mi away) and Kożuszne (4 km or 2.5 mi). The cemetery contains only a few headstones.

== Holocaust History ==
Płonna was the site of a "special camp" in 1942. The camp was used to hold Jews from the Sanok, Lesko and Dobromil powiats, that is if they weren't shot in their village or taken to the work camp in Zwangsarbeitslager Zaslaw, 30 km (19 mi) east of Bukowsko. Apparently at least 13,000 people were held at Zaslaw and then transported to Belzec extermination camp. Elderly Jews were shot in the woods near Zaslaw, according to "The Holocaust: The Jews in the County of Cracau".

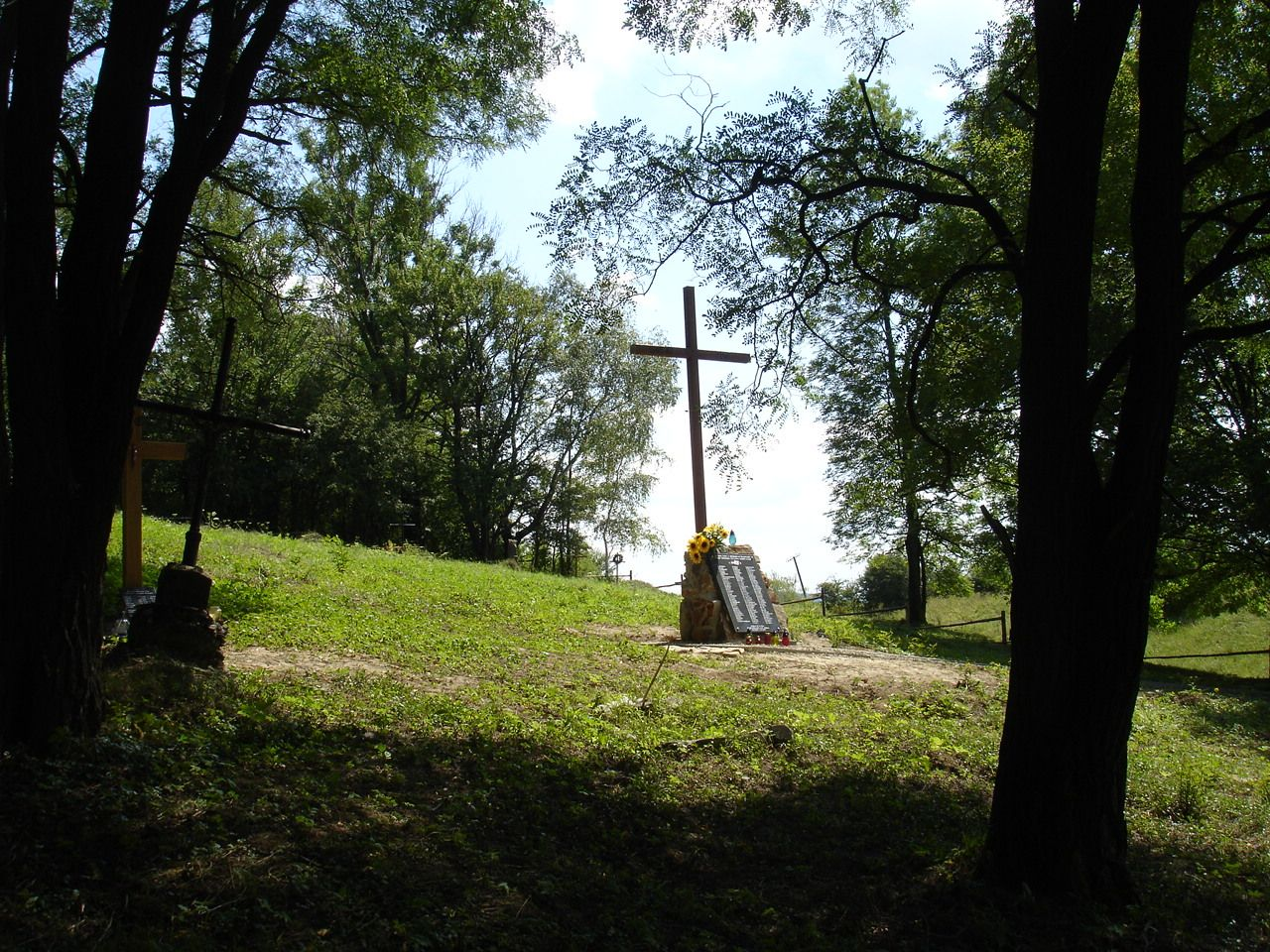
Cemetery of Płonna.Surnames for photo of gravestone.

== Population ==
Historical population
Year	Pop.	±%
1880	950	—
1936	1,002	+5.5%
2001	20	−98.0%

== Notable residents ==
- Dmytro Stetsko (1943–2017), Ukrainian painter, graphic artist, sculptor

== See also ==
- Komancza Republic (November 1918 – January 1919)

== Literature ==
- Adam Fastnacht, Nagórzany [in:] Slownik Historyczno-Geograficzny Ziemi Sanockiej w Średniowieczu (Historic-Geographic Dictionary of the Sanok District in the Middle Ages), Kraków, (II edition 2002), ISBN 83-88385-14-3.
- Jerzy Zuba "W Gminie Bukowsko". Roksana, 2004, ISBN 83-7343-150-0. Translated by Deborah Greenlee. Arlington, TX 76016.
