= Hryhorii Tereshchuk =

Ukrainian educator

- Григорій Терещук
- Born: 1 October 1954 (age 70); Vybudiv, Ukrainian SSR, Soviet Union (now Ukraine)

Hryhorii Vasylovych Tereshchuk (Ukrainian: Григорій Васильович Терещук; born 1 October 1954) is a Ukrainian educator, doctor of pedagogical sciences (1995), professor (1996), and corresponding member of the National Academy of Pedagogical Sciences of Ukraine (2003).

== Early life ==
He graduated from the Ternopil Pedagogical Institute (1976).

== Career ==
He worked as a teacher in Skalat, Ternopil Raion. In 1978 he joined the Ternopil Pedagogical Institute (now TNPU) as head of labor training, head of training workshops, Senior Lecturer, Associate Professor of the Department of pedagogical skills (1978-1995), and vice-rector for research (1995-2006). In 1998 he became head of the Department of labor trainin. In 2006 he became first vice-rector.

He was a member of the editorial board of the All-Ukrainian Journal Labor Training in Educational Institutions and other publications.

He was editor-in-chief of Scientific notes of Ternopil Pedagogical University.

== Research ==
He authored more than 80 scientific and methodological works, including 3 monographs and 8 manuals.

== Recognition ==
- Knight of the Order of Merit of the third degree (2021),
- Honored Worker of education of Ukraine (2015)
- Petro Mogila
- Excellent student of education of Ukraine

== Sources ==
- Б. Петраш, Г. Яворський, Терещук Григорій Васильович // Тернопільський енциклопедичний словник : у 4 т. / редкол.: Г. Яворський та ін., Тернопіль: Видавничо-поліграфічний комбінат «Збруч», 2008, Т. 3: П — Я, s. 414, ISBN 978-966-528-279-2.
- Терещук Григорій Васильович // ТНПУ ім. В. Гнатюка.
