= Bila Castle =

- Bila
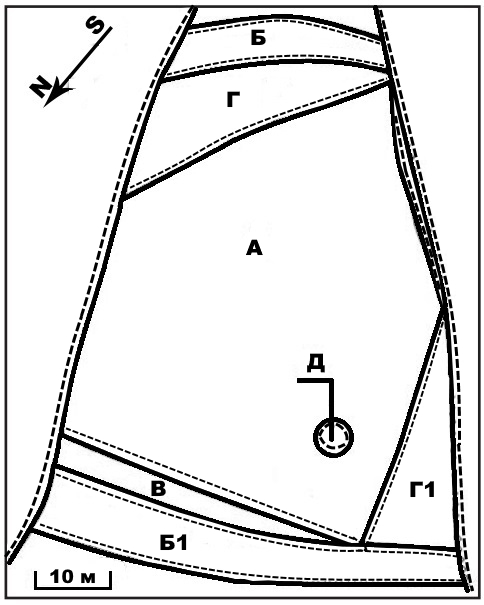
- Plan of the castle in Bila

Site information
- Owner: Ukraine
- Condition: ruined

Bila Castle (Ukrainian: Білівський замок) is a lost defensive structure in the village of Bila, Chortkiv urban hromada, Chortkiv Raion, Ternopil Oblast, Ukraine, and a newly discovered archeological site.

The remains of the castle were discovered by archaeologist Volodymyr Dobrianskyi in the fall of 2007.

== Information ==
Today, it is the only still surviving and well-preserved single-layer fortification monument of the 14th century in Western Podillia and is important for further archaeological research.

It is located on the outskirts of the village on a high cape-type hill, which is about 60 m above the level of the Seret River. This cape is an elongated triangular bend. The Seret River flows along the eastern part of the hill.

The castle has a total length of up to 100 m, and a width of 20 m in the southern section and 70 m in the northern section. The southern triangular part is cut by a ditch 5 m deep, about 15 m wide and 20 m long. The opposite, floor (northern) part of the castle is cut by an arcuate ditch 70 m long, 15 m wide, and 4-4.5 m deep. The perimeter section of the western part has a gentle slope, and the northern part has a rise on which the rampart is located. In the western corner, a well was found, preserved as a rounded pit of a depression 5 m in diameter and 1 m deep. In the southern corner, there is a triangular platform deepened by 1.5 m from the main part of the detinets, similar to the one in the western corner.

During the archaeological survey, it was found that the finds were localized in the southwestern part of the castle spire. Fragments of 14th-century pottery and ironwork were found here.

The structures and fortification lines were designed with the successful use of the natural terrain. The eastern and northern sections of the hill have steep, inaccessible slopes that provided reliable defense capabilities during military engagements. On the southern and northern sides, the hillfort is cut by a deep moat. This moat is additionally covered with a rampart in the northern section.

The second line of defense consisted of triangular platforms in the southern and western areas, which were the prototype of curtains. And when the enemy managed to capture these areas, the defense was carried out from the detinets.
