= Bohdan Buiak =

Ukrainian educator and political scientist

- Богдан Богданович Буяк
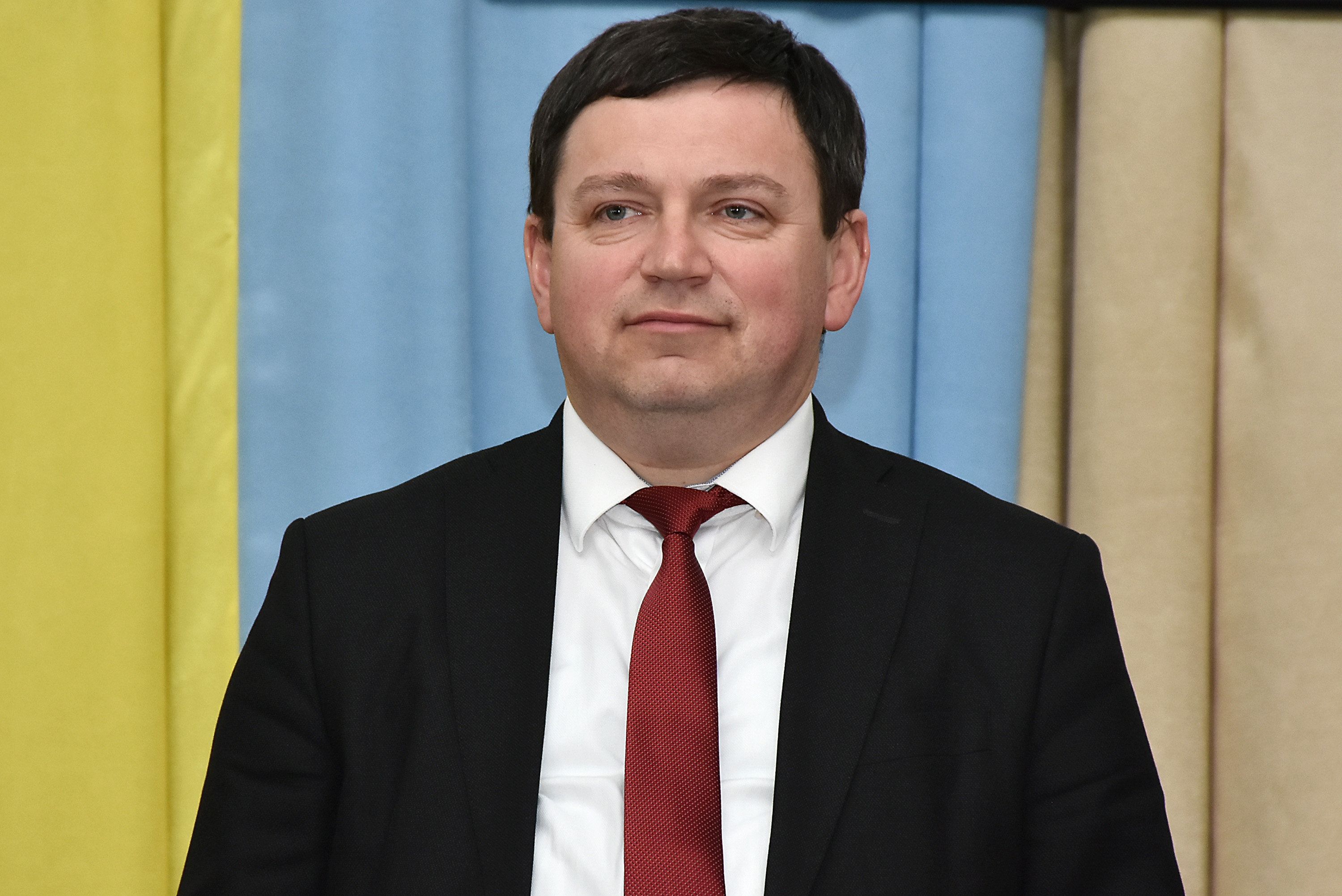
- Buiak in 2019
- Born: October 26, 1974 (age 52); Ternopil, Soviet Union

Bohdan Buiak or Bohdan Buyak (Ukrainian: Буяк Богдан Богданович; born October 26, 1974) is a Ukrainian educator, public figure, political scientist, doctor of philosophy (2013), professor (2013), correspondent member of the National Academy of Pedagogical Sciences of Ukraine (2019). Honored Worker of Education of Ukraine (2020).

Rector of the Ternopil Volodymyr Hnatiuk National Pedagogical University (December 15, 2017).

== Biography ==
Bohdan Buiak was born on October 26, 1974, in Ternopol.

He graduated from the Faculty of History of the National Pedagogical University of Volodymyr Hnatiuk in Ternopil (1997, 2000). He worked as the deputy director of Vatra-Ars LLC, head of the Pearl Club at the Vatra Palace of Culture and history teacher at the high school in Prosziwka in the Tarnopol region (1997).

In Alma-mater since 2000: Head of the Department of Educational Work, Assistant (since 2001), Associate Professor of Ukrainian History (since 2005), Professor of Ukrainian History and the Department of Philosophy and Economic Theory (since 2013), Deputy Rector for Science (2006–2008) ), Vice-Rector for Research and International Cooperation (since 2008).

On November 8, 2017, he was elected rector with 91.86% of the number of voters who took part in the vote.

Author of over 80 works, including 5 monographs and 7 textbooks. Member of the editorial board of industry publications in Ukraine and abroad.

The sphere of scientific activity – historical and philosophical foundations for the development of higher education, modernization of the educational systems of Ukraine and the world, the ideological component of political and historical-patriotic education and youth education, the futurology of pedagogical education, management and marketing of the educational process, the recent history of Ukraine.

== Awards ==
- Diploma of the Ministry of Education and Science of Ukraine (2006),
- Former Minister of Education and Science of Ukraine "Perfection in Education" (2007),
- Diploma to the Cabinet of Ministers of Ukraine (2011),
- Tarnopol City Council Awards (2012),
- Medal of the Academy of Pedagogical Sciences of Ukraine "Uszyński KD" (2020),
- Czczony Pracownik Edukacji Ukrainy (2020).

== Sources ==
- Віктор Уніят, Буяк Богдан Богданович // Тернопільський енциклопедичний словник : у 4 т. / редкол.: Г. Яворський та ін, Тернопіль: Видавничо-поліграфічний комбінат «Збруч», 2010, Т. 4: А — Я (додатковий), s. 85, ISBN 978-966-528-318-8.
- Буяк Богдан Богданович // ТНПУ ім. В. Гнатюка.
