= Rosokhach, Ternopil Oblast =

Rosokhach Росохач
- Village
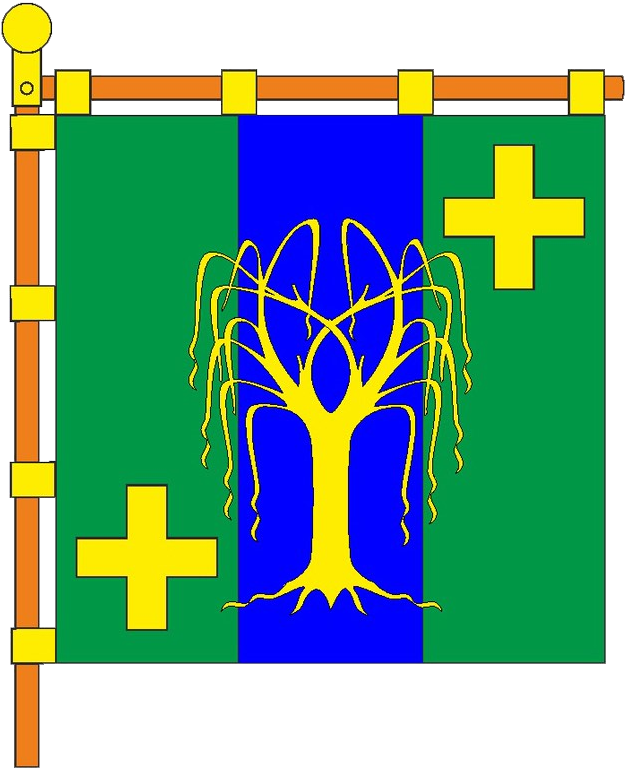
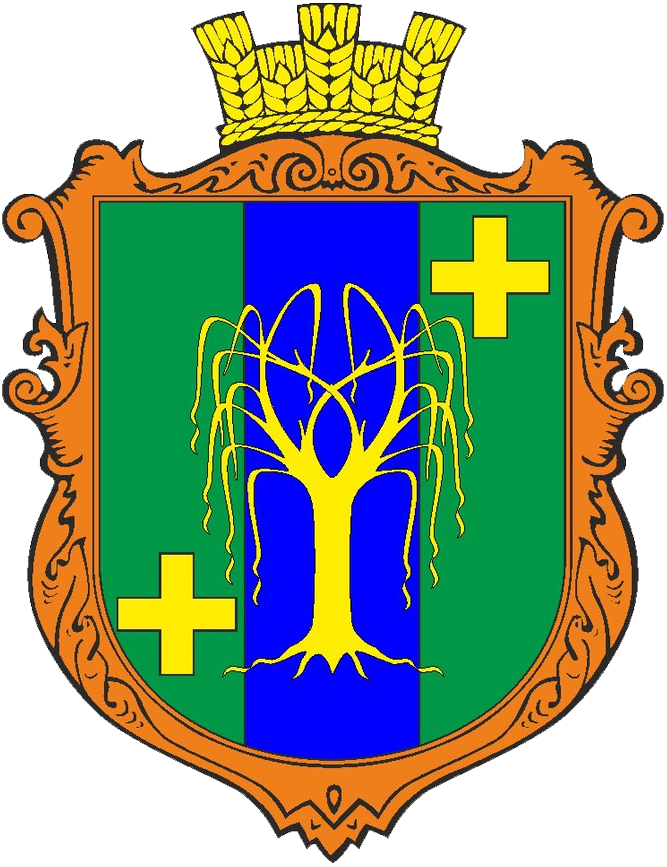
- Flag Coat of arms

- Location within Ukraine Location within Ternopil Oblast
- Coordinates: 48°57′13″N 25°48′50″E
- Country: Ukraine
- Oblast: Ternopil Oblast
- District: Chortkiv Raion
- Established: 1785

Area
  - Total: 3.263 km^{2} (1.260 sq mi)
- Elevation /(average value of): 207 m (679 ft)

Population
  - Total: 1,947
  - Density: 596.69/km^{2} (1,545.4/sq mi)
- Time zone: UTC+2 (EET)
  - Summer (DST): UTC+3 (EEST)
- Postal code: 48560
- Area code: +380 3552
- Website: село Росохач, райцентр Чортків ^{(Ukrainian)}

Rosokhach (Ukrainian: Росо́хач) is a village situated in Chortkiv Raion (district) of Ternopil Oblast (province) in western Ukraine. It belongs to Chortkiv urban hromada, one of the hromadas of Ukraine.

The village has 1947 inhabitants and local government is administered by Rosokhach village council.

== Geography ==
The village is located at an altitude of 207 meters above sea level on the banks of the Seret River, and covers an area of 3,263 km^{2}. That is located at a distance of 15 kilometres (9.3 mi) from the district center of Chortkiv and 91 kilometres (57 mi) from the regional center Ternopil.

== History ==
The first written mention of the village Rosokhach dates back to 1785. Near the village are the remains of a Trypillian culture settlement. Fragments of ceramics and copper fragments were found, which are stored in the Lviv Historical Museum.

== Cult constructions and religion ==
In the village there are two religious communities and there are two churches:

- St. Nicholas Church OCU (1904)
- St. Nicholas Church UGCC (1995).

Roman Catholic Church is in the village, which was built in 1936. Today is not valid.

== People from Rosokhach ==
- Petro Vynnychuk (born 1954), Ukrainian public and political figure, a member of the Rosokhach group
- Volodymyr Vitiv (1979—2023), Ukrainian soldier, a participant in the Russian-Ukrainian war
- Petro Vitiv (born 1956), member of the Rosokhakha national-patriotic underground organization
- Vasyl Hovika (1904—1993), Ukrainian lirnyk
- Denys Hromovyi (1987—2014), Ukrainian soldier, senior grenade launcher operator of the 3rd battalion of the 51st separate mechanized brigade (Volodymyr-Volynskyi), died in the ATO
- Andrii Kravets (1943—1996), member of the Rosokhach group
- Vasyl Lototskyi, member of the Rosokhakha national-patriotic underground organization
- Volodymyr Marmus (born 1949), Ukrainian public and political figure, writer, member of the Rosokhach group
- Mykola Marmus (born 1947), Ukrainian public and political figure, member of the Rosokhach group
- Stepan Sapeliak (1951—2012), Ukrainian writer, publicist, literary critic, public and political activist, long-term political prisoner of the pro-communist system, winner of the Taras Shevchenko State Prize of Ukraine (1993), member of the NUHRU and PEN International, honorary citizen of Ternopil
- Volodymyr Senkiv (born 1954) is a Ukrainian public and political figure, a member of the Rosokhach group

== See also ==
- Rosokhach Group
