= Dovzhok, Kamianets-Podilskyi Raion, Khmelnytskyi Oblast =

Rural locality in Khmelnytskyi Oblast, Ukraine

Dovzhok Довжок
- Village
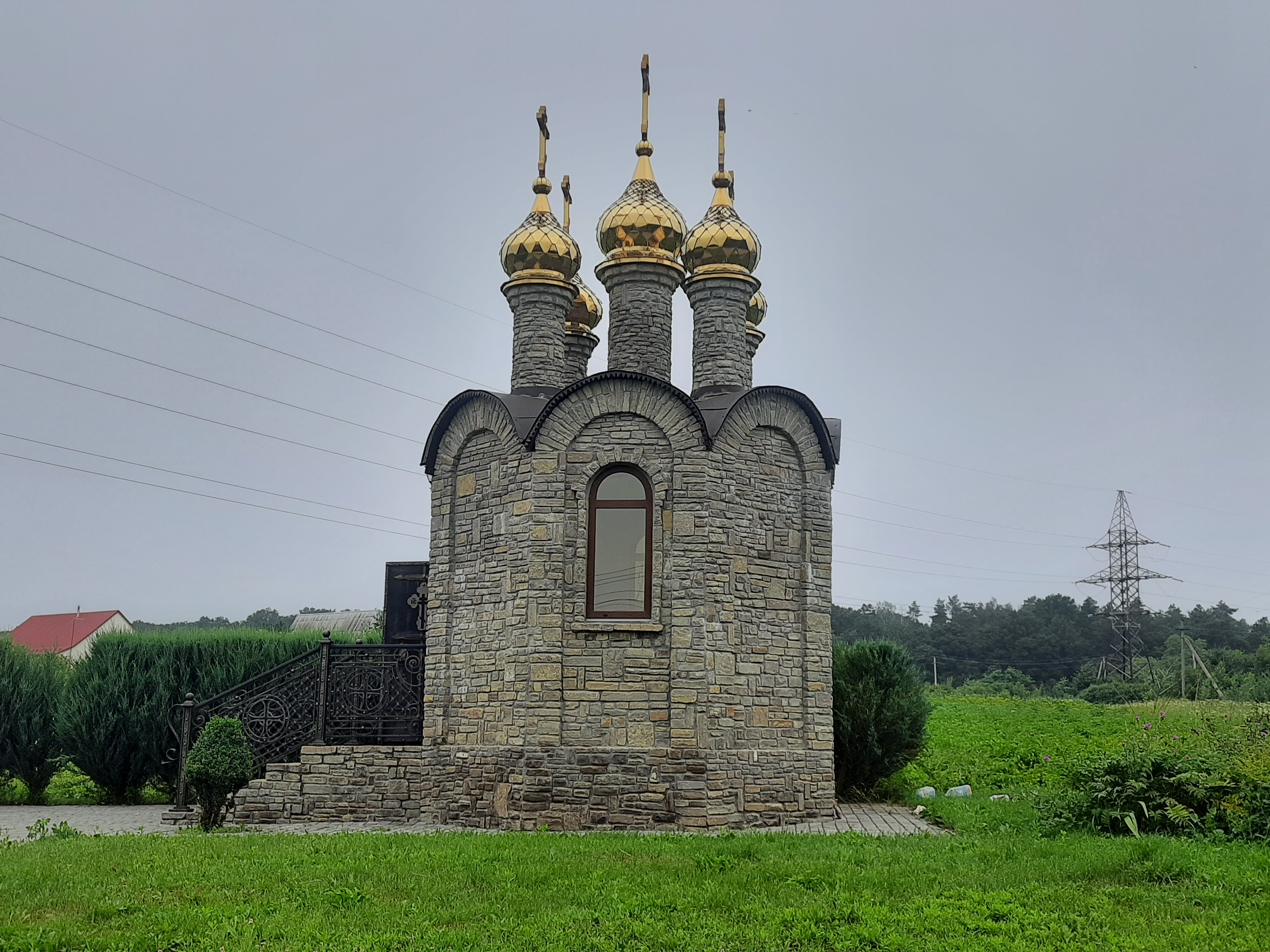

- Location of Dovzhok in Khmelnytskyi Oblast Dovzhok (Ukraine)
- Coordinates: 48°40′46″N 26°31′35″E
- Country: Ukraine
- Oblast: Khmelnytskyi Oblast
- District: Kamianets-Podilskyi Raion
- Hromada: Kamianets-Podilskyi urban hromada

Government
  - Village Head: Ruslan Riabyi

Area
  - Total: 6.101 km^{2} (2.356 sq mi)
- Elevation: 221 m (725 ft)

Population (2001)
  - Total: 4,263
  - Density: 698.7/km^{2} (1,810/sq mi)
- Time zone: UTC+2 (EET)
  - Summer (DST): UTC+3 (EEST)
- Postal code: 32343
- Area code: +380 3849
- Website: http://rada.gov.ua/

Dovzhok (Ukrainian: Довжок) is a village (a selo) in the Kamianets-Podilskyi Raion (district) of Khmelnytskyi Oblast in western Ukraine.

== Geography ==
Dovzhok is located in the southwestern part of Ukraine, 1 kilometers from Kamianets-Podilskyi.

== History ==
Dovzhok was the administrative center of the Dovzhok Raion until December 4, 1928, when its center was moved to Kamianets-Podilskyi.

August 24, 1991, the village Dovzhok became part of the independent country of Ukraine.

Dovzhok belongs to Kamianets-Podilskyi urban hromada, one of the hromadas of Ukraine.

== Population ==
The village's population was 4,263 as of the 2001 Ukrainian census.

=== Language ===
Dovzhok is located on the territory of the Podolian dialect, which belongs to the group of Volhynian-Podilian dialects of the southwestern group.

== Famous people ==
- Mykhailo Simashkevych - mayor of Kamianets-Podilskyi.
- Mykola Kushnirov - politician.

== Gallery ==
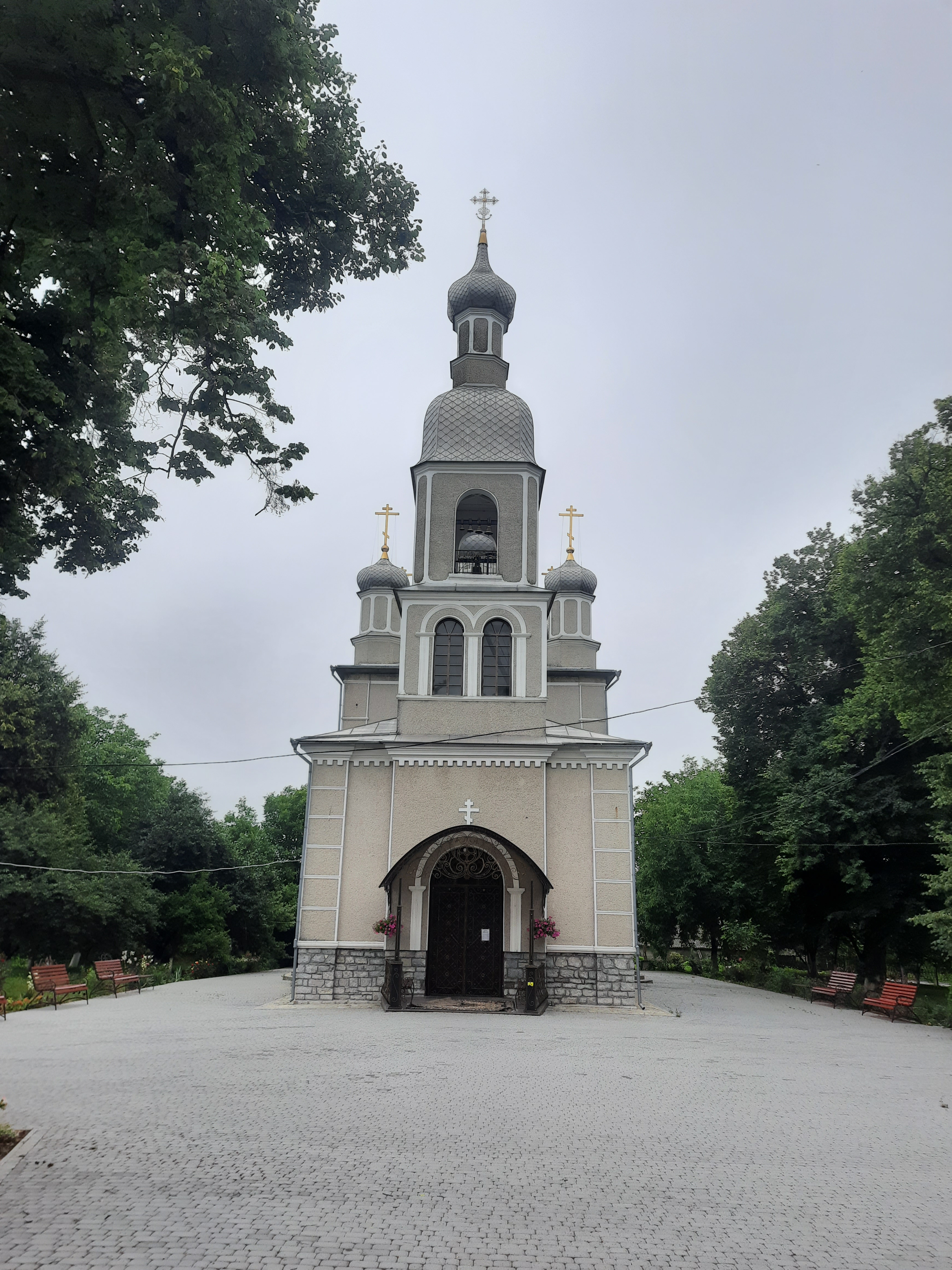
Church

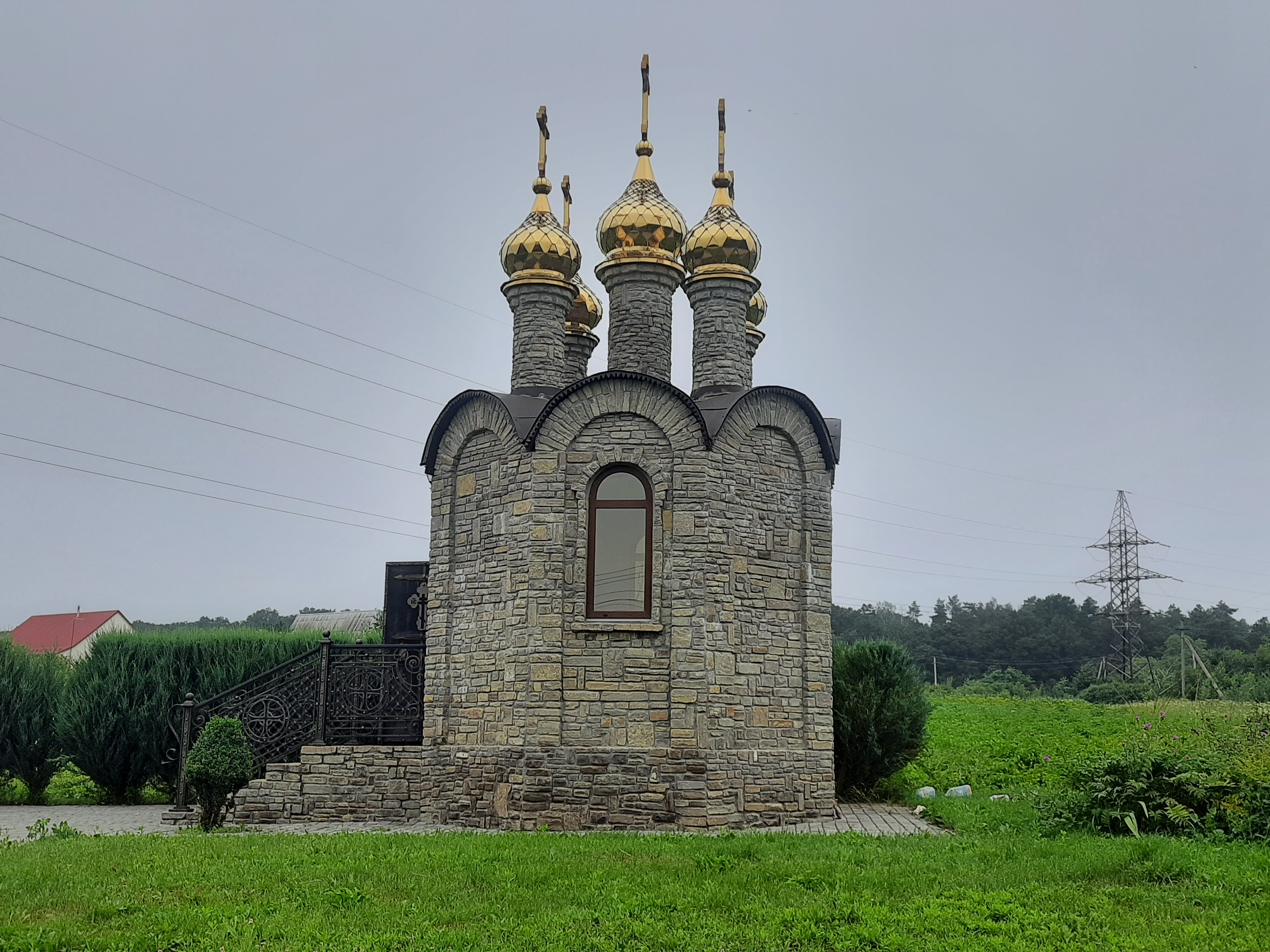
Chapel

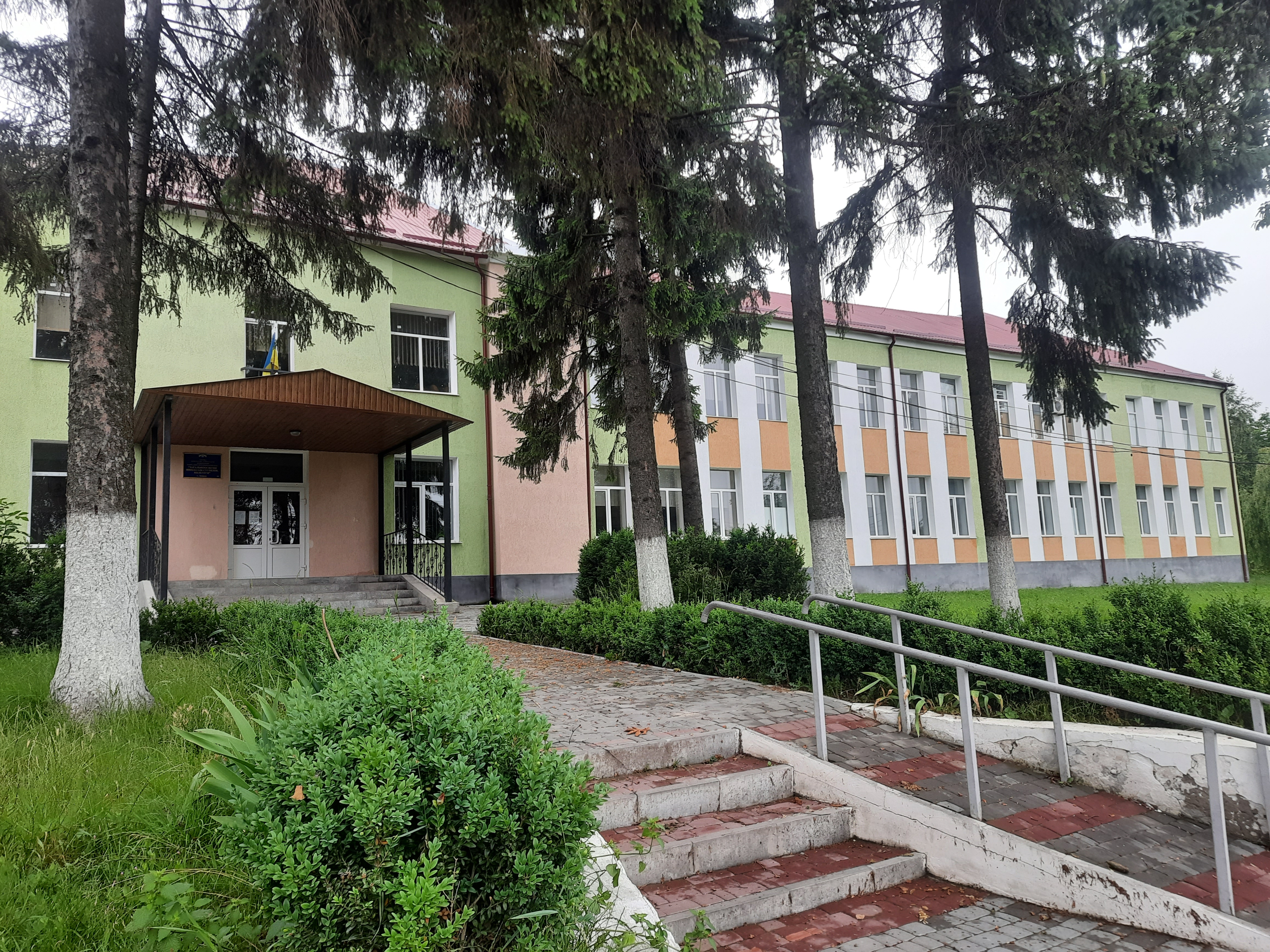
School

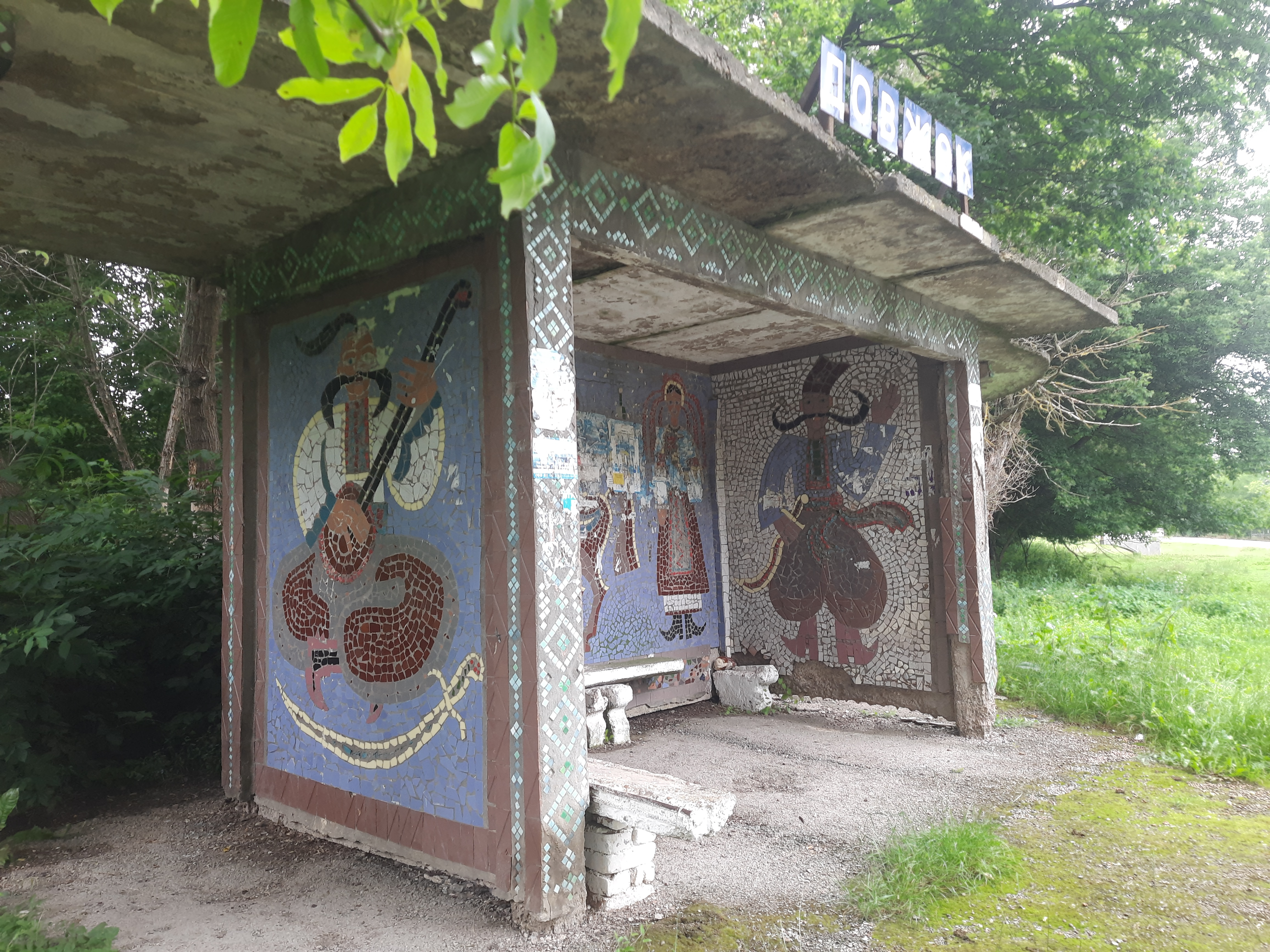
Bus stop
