= Oskil, Kharkiv Oblast =

Village in Kharkiv Oblast, Ukraine

Oskil Оскіл
- Village
- Interactive map of Oskil
- Location of Oskil Oskil (Ukraine)
- Coordinates: 49°10′32″N 37°25′31″E
- Country: Ukraine
- Oblast: Kharkiv Oblast
- Raion: Izium Raion
- Hromada: Oskil rural hromada
- Elevation: 73 m (240 ft)

Population (2001)
  - Total: 3,217
- Time zone: UTC+2
  - Summer (DST): UTC+3
- Postal code: 64340
- Area code: +380 5743

Oskil (Ukrainian: Оскіл) is a village in Izium Raion, Kharkiv Oblast of eastern Ukraine, near the right bank of the river Oskil. It is the administrative centre of Oskil rural hromada.

== History ==
In May 2022, the village was occupied by the forces of the Donetsk People's Republic, despite it not being in their claimed borders. The village was recaptured by Ukraine on September 7 during their counteroffensive in Kharkiv Oblast.
