= Volodymyr Marmus =

Ukrainian author and activist (born 1949)

- Володимир Мармус
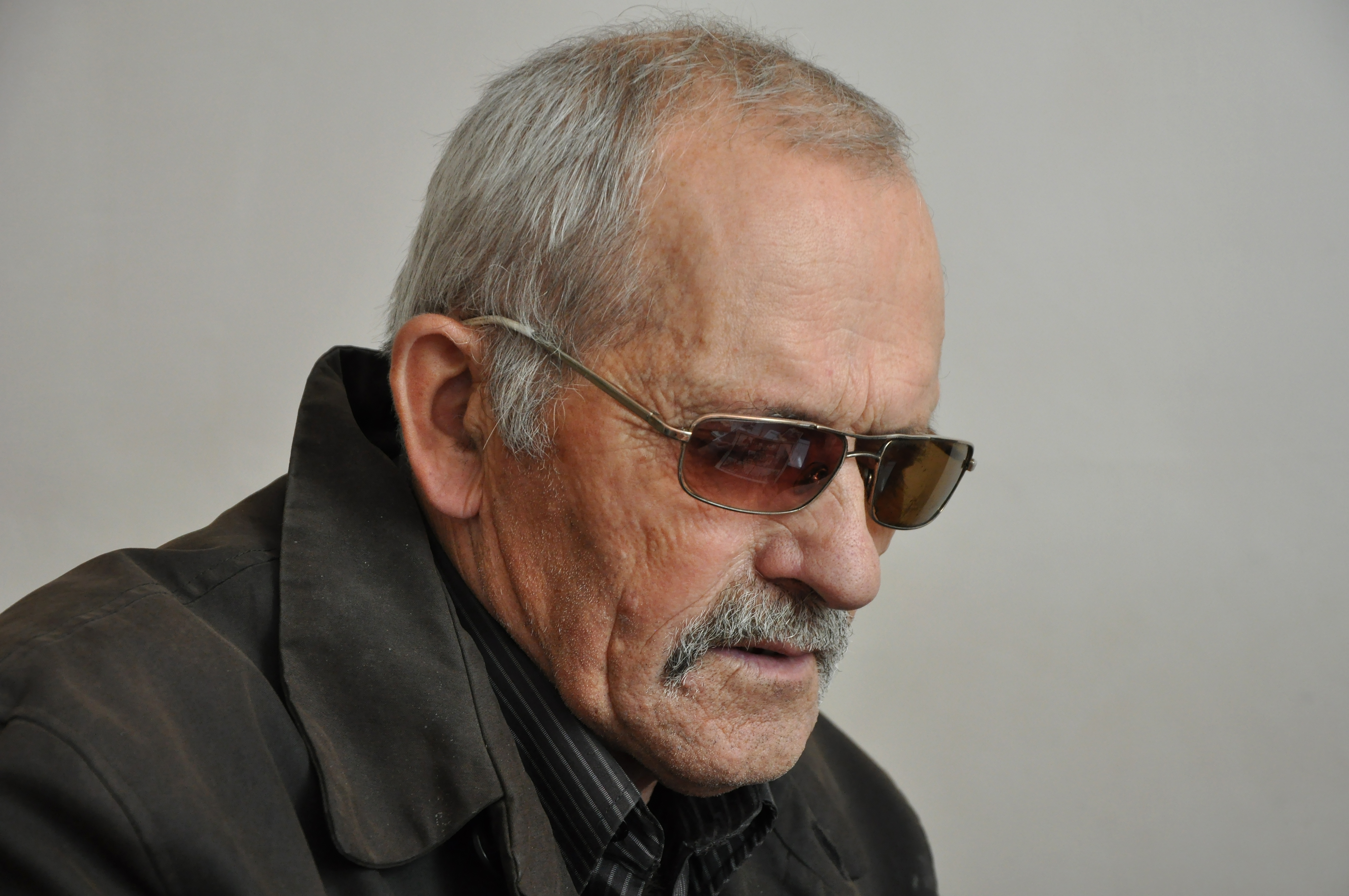
- Born: Volodymyr Vasylovych Marmus; 21 March 1949 (age 77); Rosokhach, Ternopil Oblast
- Education: Lviv Craft School, Ternopil Volodymyr Hnatiuk National Pedagogical University
- Awards: Order for Courage

Volodymyr Vasylovych Marmus (Ukrainian: Володимир Васильович Мармус; born 21 March 1949) is a Ukrainian public and political figure, participant in the national liberation struggle, writer, human rights activist.

He is the father of the Ukrainian musician, soldier, participant of the Russo-Ukrainian War Vasyl Marmus. and brother of the Ukrainian public and political figure Mykola Marmus.

== Biography ==
Marmus graduated from the Lviv Craft School (1969) and the History Department of Ternopil Volodymyr Hnatiuk National Pedagogical University (2004). He worked at the Chortkiv fattening enterprise, deputy director of the Chortkiv station of young technicians (1996−1997), consultant to the deputy head for humanitarian issues (1997−2002), chief specialist of the juvenile service of the Chortkiv District State Administration.

=== Public and political activity ===
Member of the Ukrainian Helsinki Group (1988), since 1989 — head of its district organization, member of the All-Ukrainian Society of Political Prisoners and Repressed "Memorial", People's Movement of Ukraine. Head of the district organization of the Ukrainian Republican Party (1990–1997), since 1997 — head of the district organization of the Republican Christian Party.

In 1972, he became the founder and leader of the youth organization Rosokhach Group, which on 22 January of that year hung four blue and yellow flags and several leaflets in Chortkiv on the occasion of the 55th anniversary of the proclamation of the UPR and the 54th anniversary of the "Act of Unification of the ZUNR with the UPR. Subsequently, all members of the organization were arrested and convicted on charges of creating an anti-Soviet organization and conducting anti-Soviet agitation and propaganda. In exile, they were courageous. In 2005, he was awarded the Order for Courage, 1st class.

The Kharkiv Human Rights Protection Group published a book about the members of the Rosokhach group, Yunaky z ohnennoi pechi (2003), a book of memoirs by Volodymyr Marmus, Dolia nas obrala (2004), and documentaries Prapory (2018) and Rosokhach Group (2023).

Member of the Ternopil Oblast Council (1990, 1998, 2002).

== Achievements ==
Marmus is the author of the journalistic books "Druzhe zverkhnyku" (2001, co-authored), a book of memoirs "Dolia obrala nas" (2004), "Selo Rosokhach v konteksti istorii Ukrainy" (2023).

== Awards ==
- Order for Courage, 1st class (18 August 2006)
- Jubilee Medal "20 Years of Independence of Ukraine" (27 January 2012)
- Honorary Citizen of Chortkiv (26 June 2019)
