= Kamianets-Podilskyi urban hromada =

Urban hromada of Khmelnytskyi Oblast, Ukraine

Kamianets-Podilskyi urban hromada Кам'янець-Подільська міська громада
- Hromada
- Seal

- Location within Khmelnytskyi Oblast Location within Ukraine
- Coordinates: 48°41′00″N 26°35′00″E
- Country: Ukraine
- Oblast: Khmelnytskyi Oblast
- Raion: Kamianets-Podilskyi Raion

Area
  - Total: 175.3 km^{2} (67.7 sq mi)

Population (2023)
  - Total: 115,817
- Website: kam-pod.gov.ua

Kamianets-Podilskyi urban territorial hromada (Ukrainian: Кам'янець-Подільська міська територіальна громада, romanized: Kamianets-Podilska miska terytorialna hromada) is one of Ukraine's hromadas, located within Kamianets-Podilskyi Raion within the country's western Khmelnytskyi Oblast. The capital is the city of Kamianets-Podilskyi.

The hromada has an area of 175.3 km^{2} (67.7 mi^{2}), as well as a total population of 115,817 (as of 2023).

== Composition ==
In addition to one city (Kamianets-Podilskyi), there are twelve villages within the hromada:

- Chervona Chaharivka
- Dovzhok
- Khodorivtsi
- Kniahynyn
- Kolybaivka
- Liskivtsi
- Nahoriany
- Ostrivchany
- Rykhta
- Smotrych
- Vilkhovets
- Zinkivtsi
