= Rosokhach Group =

1970s underground group in Ukraine

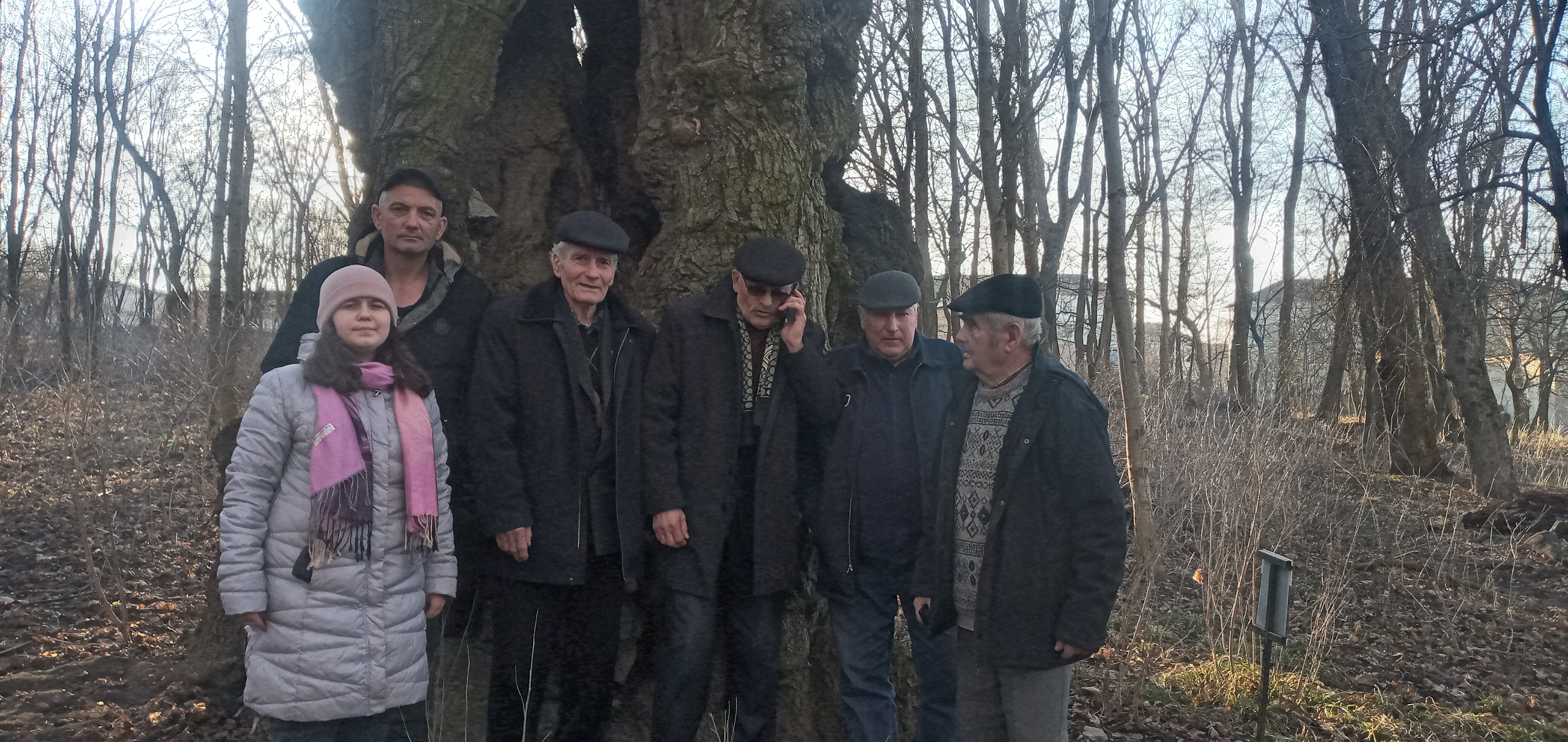
Members of the Rosokhach Group near a 560-year-old linden tree in Skala-Podilska Park

The Rosokhach Group was a national-patriotic, underground group of young people from Rosokhach, Ternopil Oblast, Ukraine, which operated in the early 1970s.

== Information ==
It was founded in 1972 by Volodymyr Marmus, a native of Rosokhach, to fight for Ukraine's independence. Its members were Volodymyr and Mykola Marmus, Petro Vitiv, Petro Vynnychuk, Vasyl Lototskyi, Volodymyr Senkiv, Andrii Kravets, Mykola Slobodian, Mykola Lysyi and Stepan Sapeliak.

On 22 January 1973, the Rosokhach Group erected four Ukrainian blue and yellow flags and posted proclamations in Chortkiv to mark the 55th anniversary of the proclamation of the Ukrainian People's Republic (UPR) and the 54th anniversary of the "Act of Unification of the ZUNR with the UPR". Subsequently, all members of the organization were arrested and convicted on charges of creating an anti-Soviet organization and conducting anti-Soviet agitation and propaganda. In 2005, the group's members were awarded the Order for Courage, 1st class.

The Kharkiv Human Rights Protection Group published a book about the members of the Rosokhach group, Yunaky z ohnennoi pechi (2003); a book of memoirs by Volodymyr Marmus, Dolia nas obrala (2004); and the documentaries Prapory (2018) and Rosokhach Group (2023). Vasyl Marmus' song "Braty po nevoli" (2022) is dedicated to the group's activities.

In 2023, a special redemption of a postal envelope dedicated to the 50th anniversary of the Rosokhach Group's share was held.

On 26 January 2012, a memorial plaque was unveiled on the building of the Oleksandr Barvinskyi Chortkiv Humanitarian and Pedagogical College.

On 22 January 2023, a memorial plaque was unveiled on the premises of the former covered market on the occasion of the 50th anniversary of the raising of blue and yellow flags over Chortkiv.

On 1 September 2023, a memorial plaque to the members of the Rosokhach group who studied there was unveiled on the facade of the Rosokhach gymnasium.
