= Bila, Chortkiv Raion, Ternopil Oblast =

Rural locality in Ternopil Oblast, Ukraine

Bila Біла
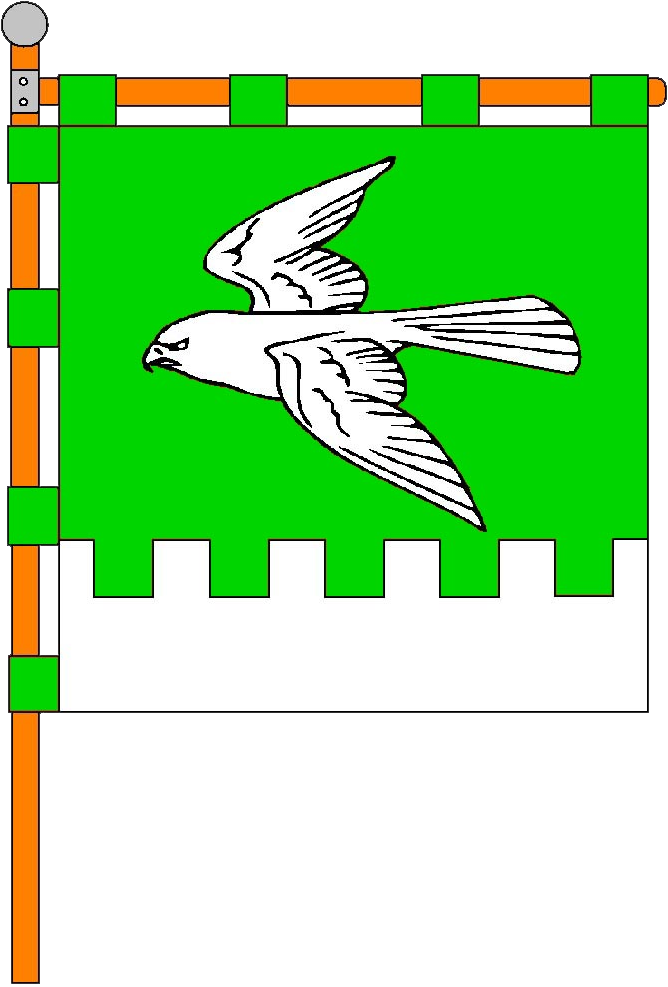
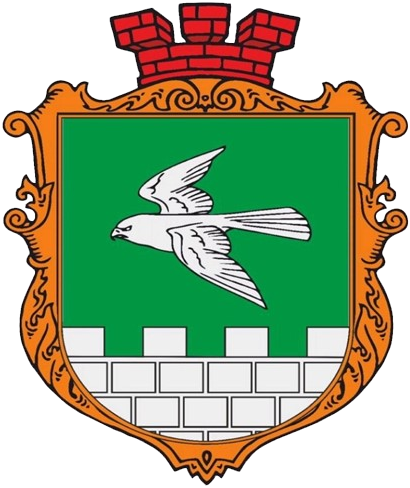
- Flag Coat of arms

- Location in Ternopil Oblast
- Coordinates: 49°02′44″N 25°46′56″E
- Country: Ukraine
- Oblast: Ternopil Oblast
- Raion: Chortkiv Raion
- Hromada: Chortkiv Hromada
- Time zone: UTC+2 (EET)
  - Summer (DST): UTC+3 (EEST)
- Postal code: 48514

Bila (Ukrainian: Біла) is a village in Ukraine, Ternopil Oblast, Chortkiv Raion, Chortkiv urban hromada.

== History ==
The first written mention dates back to the XIV century, when a castle was built in the village.

== Religion ==
- Church of the Holy Apostle Andrew the First-Called (OCU),
- Church of the Nativity of the Blessed Virgin Mary (1903, OCU, brick),
- Church of the Exaltation of the Holy Cross (2008, UGCC)
- Church of the Resurrection (1751, lost, UGCC)
- Roman Catholic chapel (1899)

== People ==
- Petro Fedoryshyn (born 1949), Ukrainian journalist, editor, teacher, and sports figure

== In the literature ==
Petro Fedoryshyn has published two books about his family's village: U vodovertiakh Seretu (2012) and Vazhkyi kozhykh, ale svii (2015).
