= Petro Fedoryshyn =

Ukrainian journalist (born 1949)

- Петро Степанович Федоришин
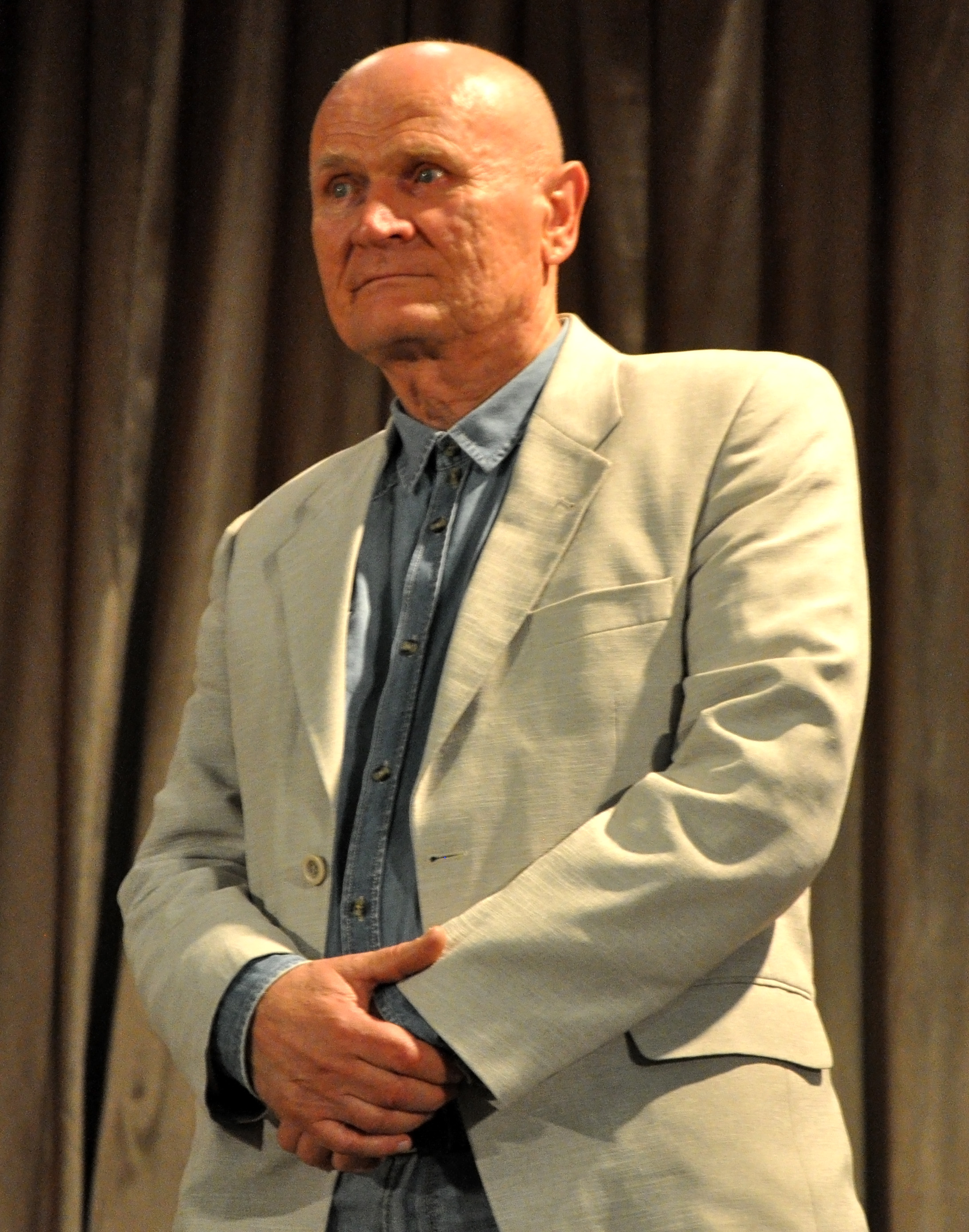
- Born: July 20, 1949 (age 76); Bila, Chortkiv Raion, Ternopil Oblast, Ukraine

Petro Stepanovych Fedoryshyn (Ukrainian: Петро Степанович Федоришин, born July 20, 1949, in Bila, Chortkiv Raion, Ternopil Oblast) is a Ukrainian journalist, editor, teacher, and sports figure. Honored journalist of Ukraine (2004). Member of the National Union of writers of Ukraine (2015). Candidate of philological Sciences (1996), docent (2004). Master of sports of the USSR in Sambo (1976), black belt holder in karate (1990). Winner of the Yaroslav Stetsko Ternopil regional prize (2013). Honorary Citizen of Chortkiv (2022).

== Biography ==
Graduated from the Faculty of journalism of Lviv University (1976). Since then, he has been working in the editorial office of the Ternopil regional newspaper "Free life" (now "Free life plus"): correspondent, head of the department, deputy editor, since 1990 – editor-in-chief. At the same time, he teaches foreign literature and journalistic skills at the Ternopil Volodymyr Hnatiuk National Pedagogical University, 2005–2009 – co-founder and head of the Department of journalism of this university.

Member of the editorial board of the 3-volume encyclopedic publication "Ternopil region. History of cities and villages".

Resident of the Ternopil regional organization of Oriental martial arts (since 1994). Karate coach of the sports club "Spartak" of the sports society "Ukraine". He has trained 3 masters of sports of Ukraine of international class in karate, 10 Masters of sports of Ukraine in karate and kickboxing, European champion O. Lelyukh (1996).

== Works ==
Author of a number of books, educational materials and literary and critical articles, essays in collections, regional and all-Ukrainian press.

Author of books:

- "Karate-do for all" (1989, 1991),
- "Echo of the ages "(1997),
- "Press and Ukrainian statehood "(1998),
- "And big money" (1999),
- "Dictionary of Ukrainian names of biblical origin" (2001),
- "In the waters of Seret" (2012),
- "Heavy casing, but your own" (2015),
- "Light and shadows of Chortkiv castles" (2019),
- "Secrets of the Sadovsky treasures" (2021).

== Sources ==
- Богдан Мельничук, Федоришин Петро Степанович // Тернопільський енциклопедичний словник : у 4 т. / редкол.: Г. Яворський та ін., Тернопіль: Видавничо-поліграфічний комбінат «Збруч», 2008, Т. 3: П — Я, s. 509, ISBN 978-966-528-279-2.

== Links ==
- Федоришин Петро Степанович // ТНПУ ім. В. Гнатюка.
