= Ternopil Volodymyr Hnatiuk National Pedagogical University =

Public university in Ukraine

- Тернопільський національний педагогічний університет імені Володимира Гнатюка
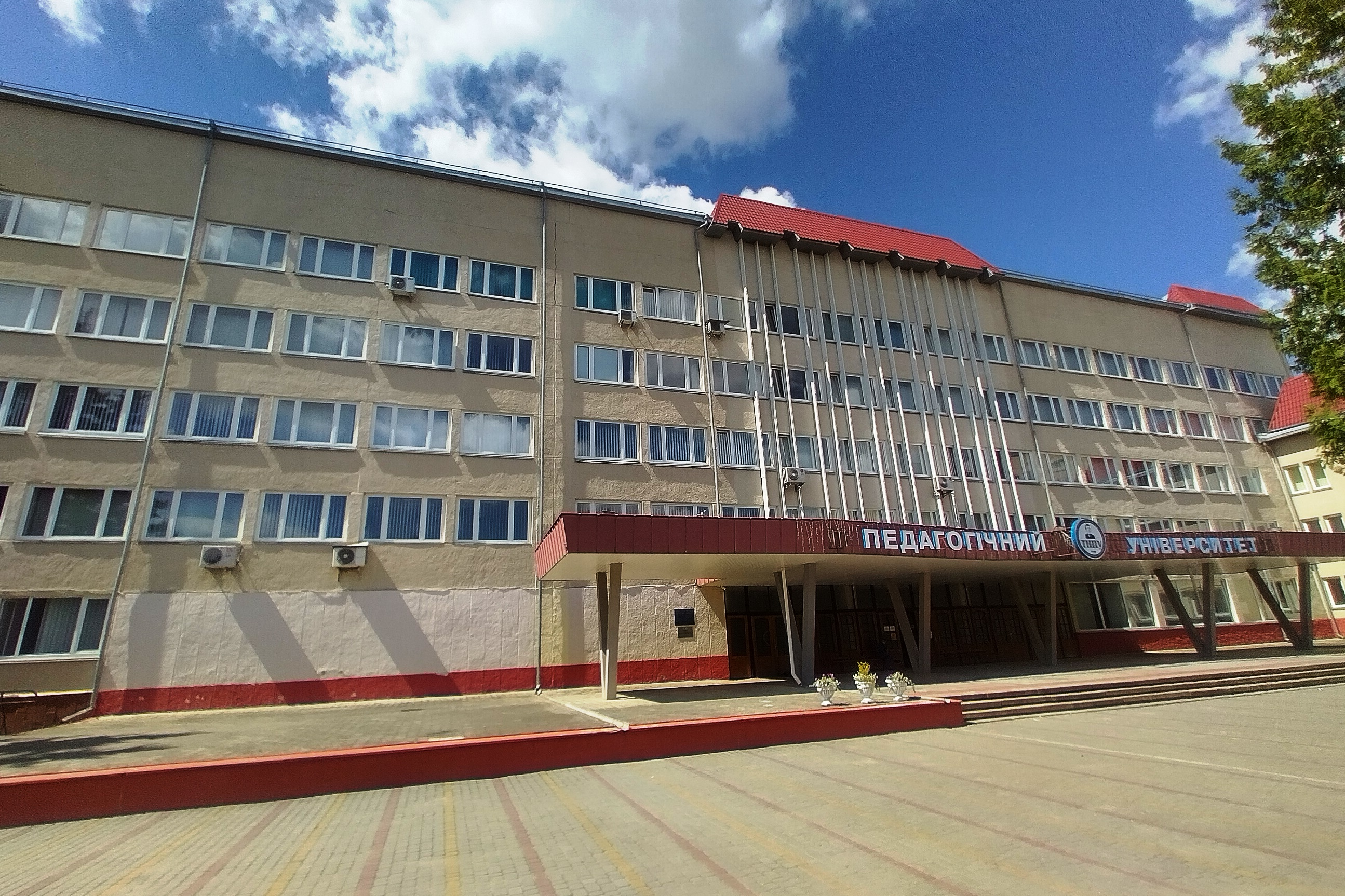
- Motto: Bona universitas paedagogica melior est, quam mala classica
- Established: 1940
- Affiliations: Ministry of Education and Science of Ukraine
- Rector: Bohdan Buiak
- Students: 7209
- Location: Ternopil, Ukraine
- Website: Official website

The Ternopil Volodymyr Hnatiuk National Pedagogical University (commonly referred to as abbr. TNPU; Ukrainian: Тернопільський національний педагогічний університет імені Володимира Гнатюка) is a public university located in Ternopil, Ukraine.

TNPU provides courses in the sciences and humanities with a focus on education and teaching. It offers postgraduate degrees mainly in teaching and the theory behind it.

== History ==
National Pedagogical University of Ternopil named after Volodymyr Hnatiuk is the oldest university in Ternopil.

On 1 October 1805, a gymnasium was opened in Krzemieniec, which in 1818 was transformed into a secondary school. In 1831 it was closed, and the material base of the high school became the main base for establishing the University of St. Vladimir in Kiev (currently Taras Shevchenko National University of Kiev). In 1920 he resumed work.

On 15 April 1940, the Krzemieniec Teachers Institute was opened, which on 4 August 1950 was transformed into a pedagogical institute. In 1969, the institution was moved to Tarnopol. In 1989, a high school with a physical and mathematical profile was opened, and in 1991, postgraduate studies.

In 1997, the Pedagogical Institute in Ternopil was reorganized into a university and named after Volodymyr Hnatiuk. In 2004, it obtained the status of a state university.

== College structure ==
=== Departments ===
- geographical;
- engineering and pedagogy;
- Foreign Languages;
- historical;
- piece;
- pedagogy and psychology;
- physical and mathematical;
- physical education;
- philology and journalism;
- chemical and biological.

== Centers ==
- Dowyszow training;
- Postgraduate studies.

=== Museum of Jherela ===
In 1995, the historian and archaeologist Oleksandr Petrovskyi founded the museum as an educational and methodological office on archeology and auxiliary historical disciplines.

== Rectors ==
- Ivan Vakula – 1940–1941, director of the Krzemieniec Teachers' Institute;
- Ulian Krahlyk – 1944–1950, director of the Krzemieniec Teachers' Institute;
- Mykola Bryhinets – 1961–1969 rector of the Krzemieniec Pedagogical Institute, 1969-1974 rector of the Pedagogical Institute in Ternopil;
- Oleksandr Yavonenko – 1974–1982;
- Ivan Butnytskyi – 1982–1984;
- Yurii Ivashchenko – 1984–1990;
- Volodymyr Kravets – 1990–2017;
- Bohdan Buiak – since 2017.

== International tie ==
- Academy of Physical Education (Wroclaw, Poland);
- Rzeszow, Zelenohurskym and University of Lublin (Poland);
- University of Economy in Bydgoszcz (Poland);
- Ukrainian consortium of universities;
- University of Warsaw (Poland);
- Rusenskym University. Angela Kancheva (Bulgaria);
- University of Applied Sciences Tsytau / Görlitz (Germany);
- University of East European Centre Hohenhaym (Stuttgart, Germany);
- University of Regensburg (Germany);
- University College of Teacher Education Carinthia (Austria);
- Campbellsville University (USA);
- University of Central Arkansas (USA);
- Southern Federal University (Russia).

== Notable alumni ==
- Mykhailo Tsymbaliuk, Head of Lviv Regional State Administration;
- Hryhorii Tereshchuk, Vice-Chancellor of the university;
- Anatolii Kudrenko, MP of Ukraine;
- Olena Pidhrushna, European champion in biathlon, Olympian
- Anzhela Balakhonova, honored Master of Sports, Olympian, world silver medalist, European champion, multiple world record holder in Europe.

Student football team became the champions of European universities in 2009 and bronze at the World Championship in 2010.

== See also ==
- Open access in Ukraine
- List of universities in Ukraine

== Sources ==
- Сеник, А. Тернопільський національний педагогічний університет // Тернопільський енциклопедичний словник: у 4 т. / редкол.: Г. Яворський та ін, Тернопіль: Видавничо-поліграфічний комбінат «Збруч», 2008, Т. 3: П – Я, s. 430–431, ISBN 978-966-528-279-2.
- 15 квітня. 70 років Тернопільському національному педагогічному університету імені Володимира Гнатюка // Література до знаменних і пам'ятних дат Тернопільщини на 2010 рік: бібліогр. покажч. Вип. 20 / Голов. упр. з питань туризму, сім'ї, молоді та спорту Терноп. облдержадмін., Упр. культури Терноп. облдержадмін., Терноп. обл. універс. наук. б-ка; уклад. М. Друневич; ред. О. Раскіна; відп. за випуск В. Вітенко, Тернопіль: Підручники і посібники, 2009, s. 65–67.
- Перший вищий навчальний заклад Надзбруччя: бібліогр. покажч. / М-во освіти і науки України, Терноп. нац. пед. ун-т ім. В. Гнатюка, наук. б-ка; уклад.: О. Я. Кульчицька, Т. Р. Матвієшин, Т.: РВВ ТНПУ, 2010, 66 s.
- 15 квітня. 75 років із часу заснування Тернопільського національного педагогічного університету імені Володимира Гнатюка // Література до знаменних і пам'ятних дат Тернопільщини на 2015 рік: бібліогр. покажч. Вип. 25 / Департамент культури, релігій та національностей Терноп. облдержадмін., Терноп. обл. універс. наук. б-ка; уклад. М. Пайонк; ред.: О. Раскіна, Г. Жовтко; кер. проєкту та наук. ред. В. Вітенко, Тернопіль: Навчальна книга – Богдан, 2014, s. 52–56.
