= Battle of Ustechko (1916) =

1916 battle of the Eastern Front during WWI

- Part of Eastern Front of World War I
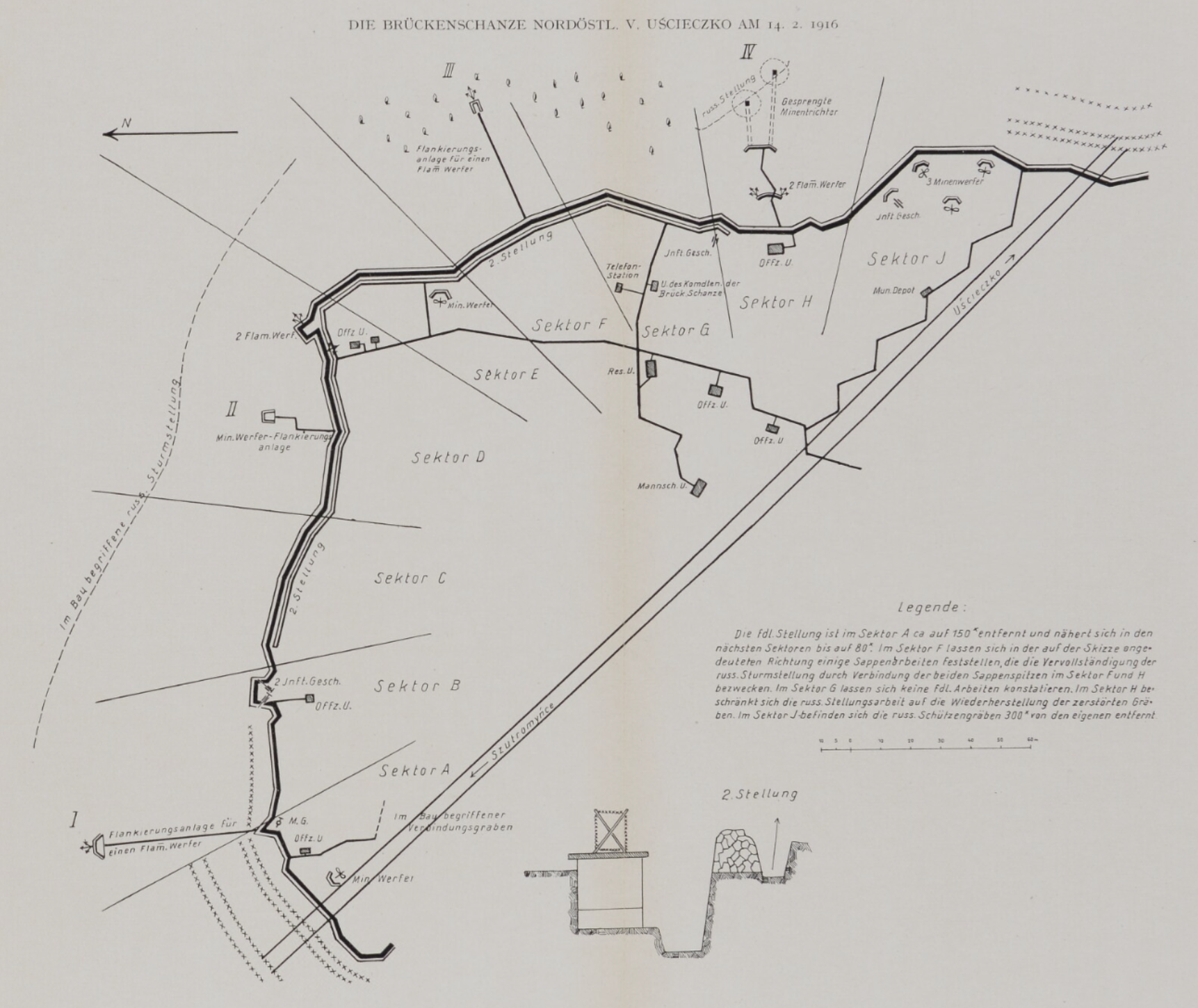
- Austrian map of the main defence point of the Ustechko bridgehead, 14 February 1916
Date	late January – 19 March 1916
Location	Ustechko, nowadays Ternopil Oblast, Ukraine 48°46′59″N 25°35′14″E
Result	Russian victory

Belligerents
German Empire; Austria-Hungary	Russian Empire

Commanders and leaders
(Austria-Hungary) Julius Planckh	?

Units involved
(Austria-Hungary) 7th Dragoon Regiment; (Austria-Hungary) 11th Dragoon Regiment	9th Army

Strength
Unknown	Unknown

Casualties and losses
c. 6,000 killed, wounded or captured	Unknown killed; Unknown wounded or missing

The Battle of Ustechko was a military engagement between troops of the Russian Empire and Austria-Hungary. Taking place between January and March 1916, the battle was part of World War I. On 19 March, after a few months of pressure, Russians captured the enemy bridgehead over the Dnister river around the village of Ustechko, Ternopil Oblast, nowadays south-western Ukraine. Actions at Ustechko were coordinated with the start of Russian Lake Naroch offensive against German forces and also the final success of Russian attempt to break Austro-Hungarian lines in Bukovina, starting with their January 1916 offensive.

== Prelude ==
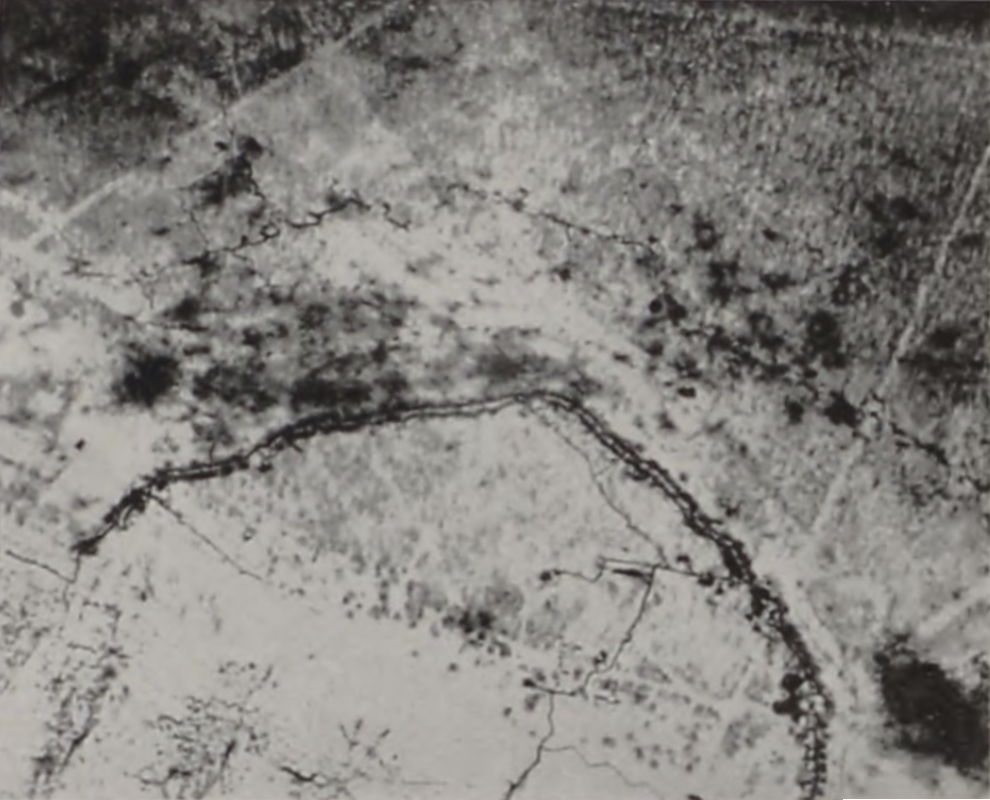
Aerial photo of the Ustechko bridgehead, c. 1916

Thanks to the Central Powers armies successes during the summer and autumn of 1915, Russian army began their Great Retreat and moved its positions far more east, behind some of the mayor rivers. In autumn Austro-Hungarian troops secured a bridgehead across the Stokhod near and south of the village of Ustechko, which could eventually serve as an important starting point of the following offensive actions. As Ustechko bridgehead became one of the easternmost positions held by the Central Powers in the region, Austro-Hungarians fortified the post in a half-circle shape and several stronghold points defended by machine guns or field cannons.

Russians gained a new initiative at the end of 1915, as they launched the battle of the Strypa River in late December 1915. The offensive of the 9th army in the Dniester region had only an auxiliary purpose and after some minor military gains, like the advance near the city of Chernogorod, on 13 January, General Alekseyev gave the order to freeze the fighting. Neverthenless, after the replacement of General Ivanov for General Brusilov at the position of the Russian high command, who decided to continue in pushes in Dnister front, Ustechko bridgehead became in January 1916 de facto permanently besieged and until the mid-March faced several Russian attacks.

== Battle ==
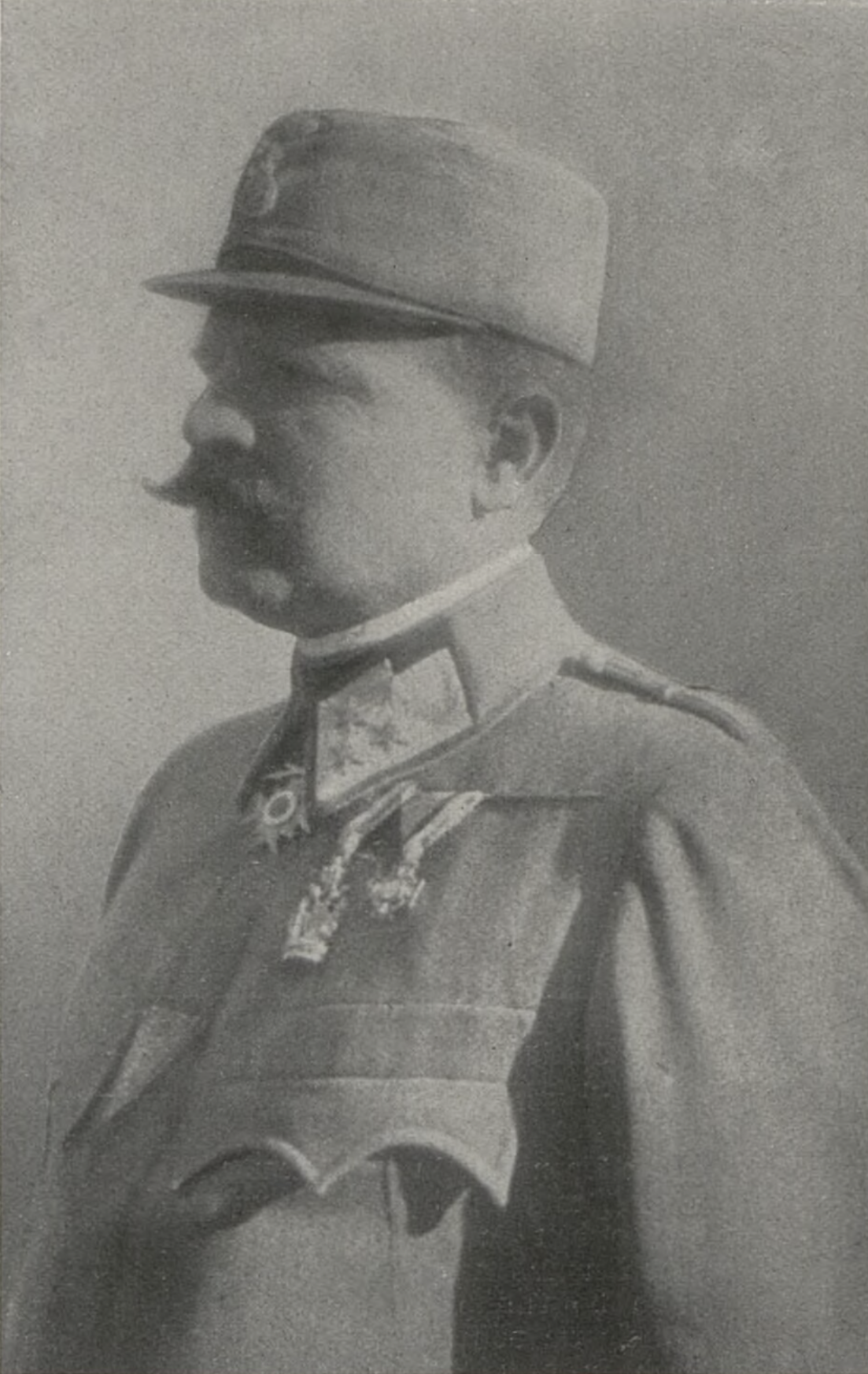
Julius Planckh, commander of the Austro-Hungarian troops in Ustechko (c. 1916)

Infantry and artillery forces of the Russian 9th Army began the intense assault actions in late January. Due to fighting during February and beginning of March Russian fire barrages badly damaged Austro-Hungarian trenched and fortified posts and the attacks of overpowering Russians deprived forces of the defenders. The final Russian push came on 19 March, the same day as Lake Naroch offensive against German positions started. Men of Cavalry Regiment No. 67 under the command of Oberst Julius Planckh made the last Austro-Hungarian attempt to hold their post, but they were overpowered: Austrian-Czech soldier Raimund Vlček, battle survivor, later declared that on the final day of the attack just 30 defenders faced 400 Russians. At 5 p.m. Planckh gave the order to evacuate the positions on the other Dniester bank.

German sources declared Austro-Hungarian losses of about 6,000 men killed or wounded during eight weeks of fighting. Raimund Vlček also claimed, that few days after taking Ustechko Russian troops invaded Ustechko garrisonand massacred some of the remaining Austro-Hungarian wounded.

== Aftermath ==
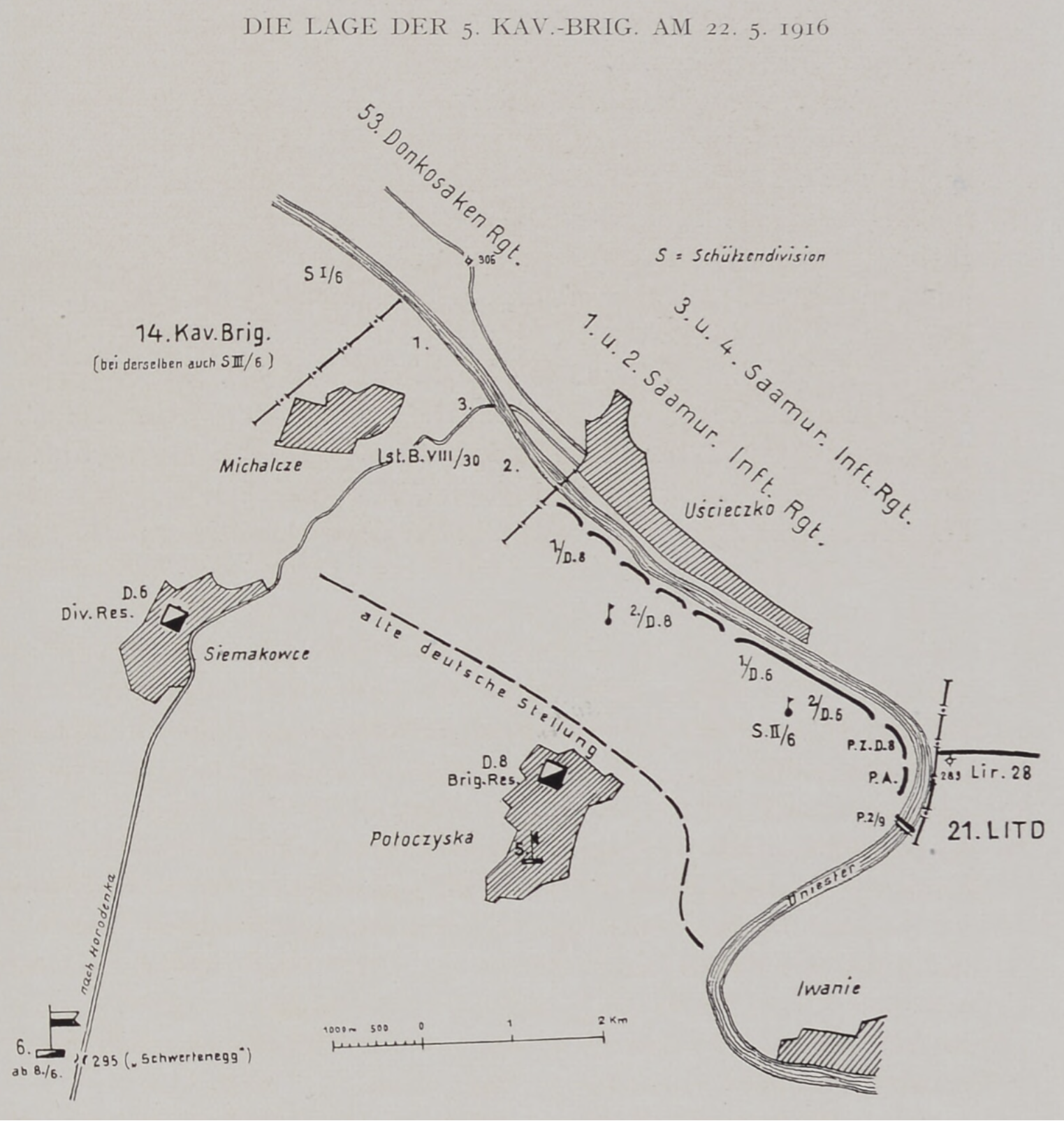
Positions of the Austro-Hungarian 5th Cavalry Brigade near Ustechko on Dnister, 22 May 1916

Austro-Hungarian high command informed about their defeat on 21 March. German and Austro-Hungarian media informed about the battle as a moment of extraordinary heroism of the bridgehead defenders. Some of the Russian troops tried to continue in advance in direction of Toporoutz, but were stopped in a few days.

In summer 1916 Ustechko bridgehead was successfully used during the Brusilov offensive operations.

== In art ==
In April 1916 the events of the battle were adapted on one of the stages of the Viennese War Exhibition, where the soldiers of the 11th Dragoon Regiment, survivors of the battle, who were permitted with a leave from the front, joined the performance as actors. This specific event is mentioned in satirical theatre play The Last Days of Mankind by Austrian writer Karl Kraus, who criticised the Viennese War Exhibition performance as humiliating and inhumane for the joined eyewitnesses.

== See also ==
- Battle of the Strypa River
- Brusilov Offensive
- Ukraine in World War I
- Karl Kraus

== Bibliography ==
- Oleynikov, Alexei (2024). Великое отступление и стабилизация восточного фронта [The Great Retreat and stabilization of the Eastern Front]. Moscow: Вече. ISBN 978-5-4484-4482-1.
- Zayonchkovsky, Andrey (2002) [1929]. Первая Мировая Война [The First World War] (in Russian). St.Petersburg: Poligon. ISBN 5-89173-174-6.
