= Sadky =

Sadky may refer to:

- Sadky, Chortkiv Raion, Ternopil Oblast, Ukraine
- Sadky, Sumy Raion, Ukraine
