= Maria Humeniuk =

Ukrainian politician and writer (born 1948)

- Марія Гуменюк
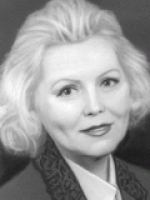
- Official portrait, 1990

People's Deputy of Ukraine
- In office 15 May 1990 – 10 May 1994
- Preceded by: Position established
- Succeeded by: Constituency abolished
- Constituency: Ternopil Oblast, Ternopil

Personal details
- Born: Maria Vasylivna Kuzemko; 26 February 1948 (age 78) Buriakivka, Ukrainian SSR, Soviet Union (now Ukraine)
- Party: People's Movement of Ukraine
- Other political affiliations: Democratic Bloc; Ukrainian Helsinki Union; Ukrainian Republican Party
- Education: Ternopil Pedagogical Institute

Maria Vasylivna Humeniuk (Ukrainian: Марі́я Васи́лівна Гуменю́к; née Kuzemko; born 26 February 1948) is a Ukrainian politician and writer who served as a People's Deputy of Ukraine from 1990 to 1994, representing the city of Ternopil for the Democratic Bloc coalition. Humeniuk is also a prose writer.

== Early life and education ==
Maria Humeniuk (Kuzemko) was born on 26 February 1948 in the village of Buriakivka, Ternopil Oblast. In 1991, she graduated from the Faculty of Philology of the Ternopil Pedagogical Institute (now the Ternopil Volodymyr Hnatiuk National Pedagogical University). From 1986 to 1988, Maria Humeniuk was the referent of the Ternopil Oblast branch of the Znannia society.

== Political career ==
In 1989, Humeniuk became one of the co-founders of the Ternopil Oblast branch of the People's Movement of Ukraine (Ukrainian: Народний рух України, romanized: Narodnyi rukh Ukrainy; abbreviated Rukh). She was later deputy chair and co-chair of Rukh in Ternopil. At the same time, Humeniuk was elected as a deputy head for ideology and information of the Secretariat of the People's Movement of Ukraine as the NRU Secretariat in Kyiv.

During 1989–1991, Humeniuk organized and headed the Ternopil Oblast branch of the Memorial society. She was a member of the Ukrainian Helsinki Union and the Ukrainian Republican Party. During that time, she was prosecuted twice for political reasons.

In 1989, Humeniuk became the founder and editor of the semi-legal newspaper Dzvin under the aegis of Memorial. In 1990, she was elected as a deputy to the Ternopil Oblast Council serving as chair of the Cultural and Spiritual Revival Commission. There, she prepared a draft decision on the rehabilitation of the Ukrainian Greek-Catholic and Autocephalous Churches".

Humeniuk was elected as a People's Deputy of Ukraine in the 1990 Ukrainian Supreme Soviet election, representing the city of Ternopil. She was elected from the Democratic Bloc, a coalition that included Rukh. Humeniuk was a member of the Verkhovna Rada Spiritual and Cultural Revival Commission. She authored amendments to the Law "On Military Service".

Humeniuk took part in hunger strikes as part of the Revolution on Granite in October 1990. On 9 September 2009, she received the Gratitude of the President of Ukraine on the occasion of the formation of Rukh.

== Literary and personal life ==
Since 1983, Humeniuk's stories have been published in the Literary Ukraine, the magazine "Soviet Woman", and in the regional press. In 1988, her first prose book, I Live and Love, was published.

Humeniuk's daughter is Larysa Lebedivna, a poet. Larysa is the author of the poetry books Nioba (2018), Not Eve (2017) and the prose poetry collection Winter Dialogues (2012).
