= Lytiachi =

Rural locality in Ternopil Oblast, Ukraine

Lytiachi Литячі
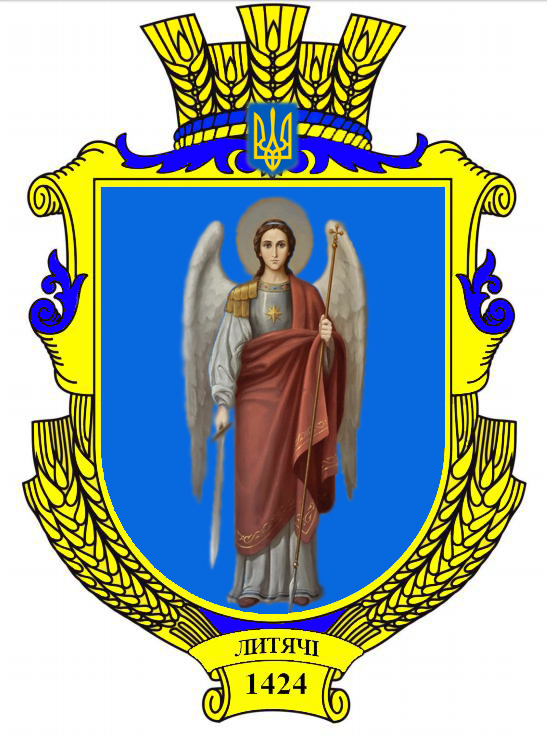
- Coat of arms

- Location in Ternopil Oblast
- Coordinates: 48°49′48″N 25°29′07″E
- Country: Ukraine
- Oblast: Ternopil Oblast
- Raion: Chortkiv Raion
- Hromada: Tovste settlement hromada
- Time zone: UTC+2 (EET)
  - Summer (DST): UTC+3 (EEST)
- Postal code: 48678

Lytiachi (Ukrainian: Литячі) is a village in Tovste settlement hromada, Chortkiv Raion, Ternopil Oblast, Ukraine.

== History ==
The first written mention is from 1424.

After the liquidation of the Zalishchyky Raion on 19 July 2020, the village became part of the Chortkiv Raion.

== Religion ==
- St. Michael's church (1828, brick, OCU; 1997, UGCC),
- chapels: Roman Catholic (1887) and Mother of God (1993).

== Sources ==
- (in Ukrainian) Бігус М., Дубецький І., Олійник В., Литячі // Ternopil Encyclopedic Dictionary: in 4 v. / editorial board: H. Yavorskyi and other, Ternopil: "Zbruch", 2005, V. 2: К—О, S. 369. — ISBN 966-528-199-2.
- "Latacz". Geographical Dictionary of the Kingdom of Poland (in Polish). 5. Warszawa: Kasa im. Józefa Mianowskiego. 1884. p. 97.
