= Popivtsi, Chortkiv Raion, Ternopil Oblast =

Rural locality in Ternopil Oblast, Ukraine

Popivtsi Попівці
- Location in Ternopil Oblast
- Coordinates: 48°53′1″N 25°34′20″E
- Country: Ukraine
- Oblast: Ternopil Oblast
- Raion: Chortkiv Raion
- Hromada: Tovste settlement hromada
- Time zone: UTC+2 (EET)
  - Summer (DST): UTC+3 (EEST)
- Postal code: 48612

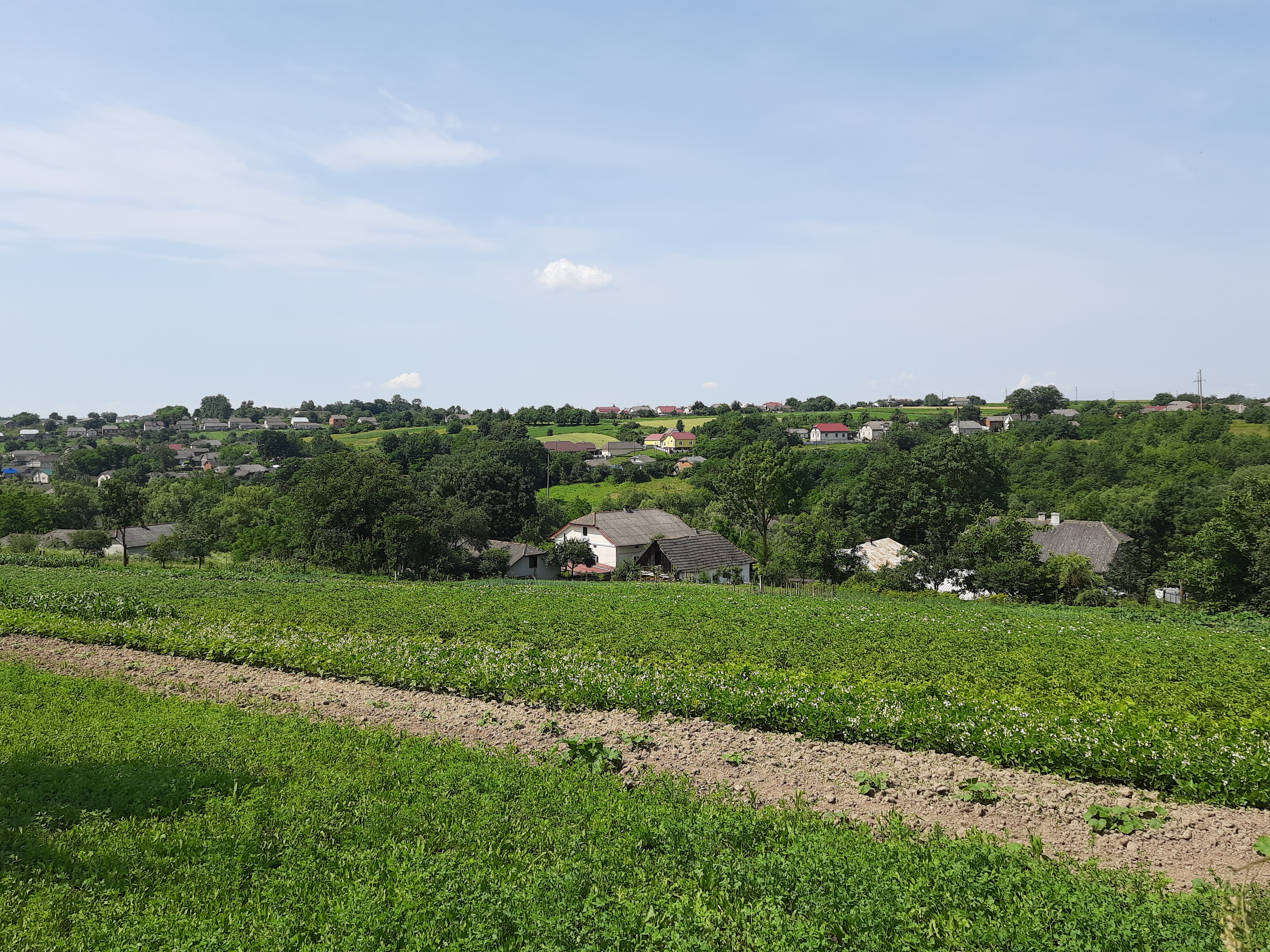

Popivtsi (Ukrainian: Попівці) is a village in Tovste settlement hromada, Chortkiv Raion, Ternopil Oblast, Ukraine.

== History ==
It was first mentioned in writings in 1428.

After the liquidation of the Zalishchyky Raion on 19 July 2020, the village became part of the Chortkiv Raion.

== Religion ==
- Two churches of the Nativity of the Blessed Virgin Mary (1884, brick, OCU; UGCC, 1997). (Christian Catholic)

== Sources ==
- (in Ukrainian) Григорків, Р., Попівці // Ternopil Encyclopedic Dictionary: in 4 v. / editorial board: H. Yavorskyi and other, Ternopil: "Zbruch", 2008, V. 3: П—Я, S. 118. — ISBN 978-966-528-279-2.
- "Popowce, wś, pow. zaleszczycki". Geographical Dictionary of the Kingdom of Poland (in Polish). 8. Warszawa: Kasa im. Józefa Mianowskiego. 1887. p. 798.
