= Vorvulyntsi =

Rural locality in Ternopil Oblast, Ukraine

Vorvulyntsi Ворвулинці
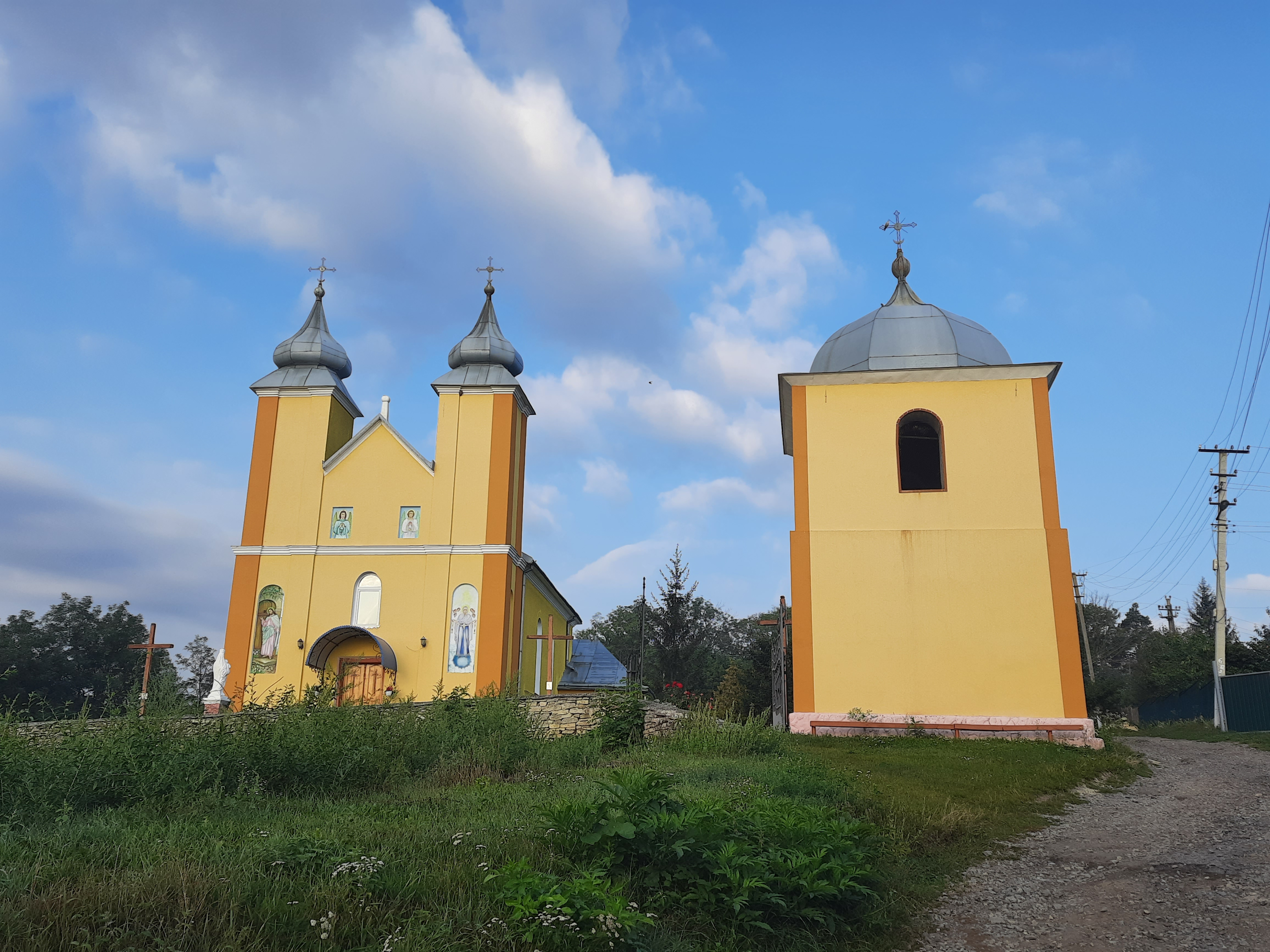
- Church of the Intercession of the Blessed Virgin Mary (1879)

- Location in Ternopil Oblast
- Coordinates: 48°47′40″N 25°44′26″E
- Country: Ukraine
- Oblast: Ternopil Oblast
- Raion: Chortkiv Raion
- Hromada: Tovste settlement hromada
- Time zone: UTC+2 (EET)
  - Summer (DST): UTC+3 (EEST)
- Postal code: 48640

Vorvulyntsi (Ukrainian: Ворвулинці) is a village in the Tovste settlement hromada, Chortkiv Raion, Ternopil Oblast, Ukraine.

== History ==
The first written mention is from 1414.

After the liquidation of the Zalishchyky Raion on 19 July 2020, the village became part of the Chortkiv Raion.

== Religion ==
- Church of the Intercession (1879; brick).

== Sources ==
- (in Ukrainian) , Ворвулинці // Ternopil Encyclopedic Dictionary: in 4 v. / editorial board: H. Yavorskyi and other, Ternopil: "Zbruch", 2004, V. 1: А—Й, 696 s. — ISBN 966-528-197-6.
- "Worwolińce". Geographical Dictionary of the Kingdom of Poland (in Polish). 14. Warszawa: Kasa im. Józefa Mianowskiego. 1895. p. 7.
- "Worwolińce". Geographical Dictionary of the Kingdom of Poland (in Polish). p. 703.
