= Svydova, Ternopil Oblast =

Village in Ternopil Oblast, Ukraine

Svydova Свидова
- Location in Ternopil Oblast
- Coordinates: 48°52′16″N 25°43′42″E
- Country: Ukraine
- Oblast: Ternopil Oblast
- Raion: Chortkiv Raion
- Hromada: Tovste Hromada
- Postal code: 48544

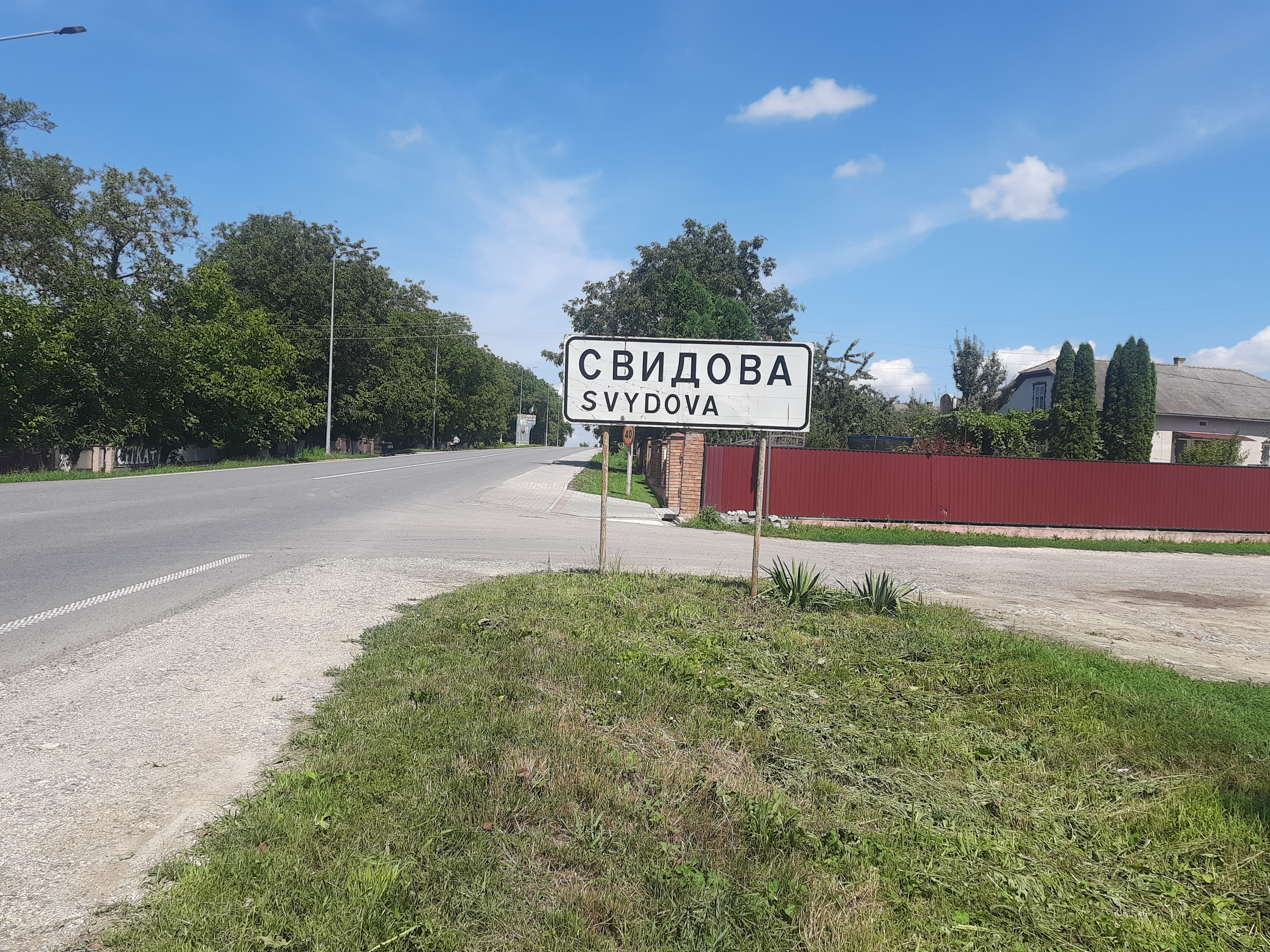
Road sign at the entrance to the village of Svydova

Svydova (Ukrainian: Свидова) is a village in Tovste settlement hromada, Chortkiv Raion, Ternopil Oblast, Ukraine.

== History ==
The first written mention dates back to 1457.

== Religion ==
Saint Nicholas Church (UGCC, 1843, brick)

== Sources ==
- "Świdowa". Geographical Dictionary of the Kingdom of Poland (in Polish). 11. Warszawa: Kasa im. Józefa Mianowskiego. 1890. p. 649.
