= Koshylivtsi =

Rural locality in Ternopil Oblast, Ukraine

Koshylivtsi Кошилівці
- Location in Ternopil Oblast
- Coordinates: 48°52′13″N 25°34′45″E
- Country: Ukraine
- Oblast: Ternopil Oblast
- Raion: Chortkiv Raion
- Hromada: Tovste settlement hromada
- Time zone: UTC+2 (EET)
  - Summer (DST): UTC+3 (EEST)
- Postal code: 48612

Koshylivtsi (Ukrainian: Кошилівці) is a village in Tovste settlement hromada, Chortkiv Raion, Ternopil Oblast, Ukraine.

== History ==
The first written mention is from 1428.

After the liquidation of the Zalishchyky Raion on 19 July 2020, the village became part of the Chortkiv Raion.

== Religion ==
- Two churches of the Assumption (1849, brick, OCU; 2011, UGCC).

== Sources ==
- Кошилівці // Енциклопедія українознавства : Словникова частина : [в 11 т.] / Наукове товариство імені Шевченка; гол. ред. проф., д-р Володимир Кубійович. — Париж — Нью-Йорк : Молоде життя, 1955–1995, ISBN 5-7707-4049-3, Т. 3, S. 1156.
- Черновол, Д. К. Кошилівці // Енциклопедія Сучасної України [Електронний ресурс] / Редкол. : І. М. Дзюба, А. І. Жуковський, М. Г. Железняк [та ін.]; НАН України, НТШ. – К. : Інститут енциклопедичних досліджень НАН України, 2014.
- (in Ukrainian) Олійник В., Уніят В., Кошилівці // Ternopil Encyclopedic Dictionary: in 4 v. / editorial board: H. Yavorskyi and other, Ternopil: "Zbruch", 2005, V. 2: К—О, S. 210. — ISBN 966-528-199-2.
- "Koszyłowce". Geographical Dictionary of the Kingdom of Poland (in Polish). 4. Warszawa: Kasa im. Józefa Mianowskiego. 1883. p. 490.
