= Slobidka, Chortkiv Raion, Ternopil Oblast =

Rural locality in Ternopil Oblast, Ukraine

Slobidka Слобідка
- Location in Ternopil Oblast
- Coordinates: 48°54′2″N 25°34′55″E
- Country: Ukraine
- Oblast: Ternopil Oblast
- Raion: Chortkiv Raion
- Hromada: Tovste settlement hromada
- Time zone: UTC+2 (EET)
  - Summer (DST): UTC+3 (EEST)
- Postal code: 48611

Slobidka (Ukrainian: Слобідка) is a village in Tovste settlement hromada, Chortkiv Raion, Ternopil Oblast, Ukraine.

== History ==
The first written mention is from 1595.

After the liquidation of the Zalishchyky Raion on 19 July 2020, the village became part of the Chortkiv Raion.

== Religion ==
- Two churches of St. Michael (1882, brick, restored in 1992, OCU; 1995, UGCC).

== Sources ==
- (in Ukrainian) Гаврилюк О., Кишкан В., Слобідка // Ternopil Encyclopedic Dictionary: in 4 v. / editorial board: H. Yavorskyi and other, Ternopil: "Zbruch", 2008, V. 3: П—Я, S. 290. — ISBN 978-966-528-279-2.
