= Korolivka, Tovste settlement hromada, Chortkiv Raion, Ternopil Oblast =

Rural locality in Ternopil Oblast, Ukraine

Korolivka Королівка
- Location in Ternopil Oblast
- Coordinates: 48°48′48″N 25°43′34″E
- Country: Ukraine
- Oblast: Ternopil Oblast
- Raion: Chortkiv Raion
- Hromada: Tovste settlement hromada
- Time zone: UTC+2 (EET)
  - Summer (DST): UTC+3 (EEST)
- Postal code: 48630

Korolivka (Ukrainian: Королівка) is a village in Tovste settlement hromada, Chortkiv Raion, Ternopil Oblast, Ukraine.

== History ==
The first written mention is from 1821.

After the liquidation of the Zalishchyky Raion on 19 July 2020, the village became part of the Chortkiv Raion.

== Religion ==
- Church of the Ascension (1996, brick, UGCC).

== Sources ==
- (in Ukrainian) Лашта, В., Королівка // Ternopil Encyclopedic Dictionary: in 4 v. / editorial board: H. Yavorskyi and other, Ternopil: "Zbruch", 2005, V. 2: К—О, S. 182. — ISBN 966-528-199-2.
- "Karolówka 2.) K., wś, powiat zaleszczycki". Geographical Dictionary of the Kingdom of Poland (in Polish). 3. Warszawa: Kasa im. Józefa Mianowskiego. 1882. p. 853.
