= Holovchyntsi, Ternopil Oblast =

Rural locality in Ternopil Oblast, Ukraine

Holovchyntsi Головчинці
- Location in Ternopil Oblast
- Coordinates: 48°49′46″N 25°43′56″E
- Country: Ukraine
- Oblast: Ternopil Oblast
- Raion: Chortkiv Raion
- Hromada: Tovste settlement hromada
- Time zone: UTC+2 (EET)
  - Summer (DST): UTC+3 (EEST)
- Postal code: 48630

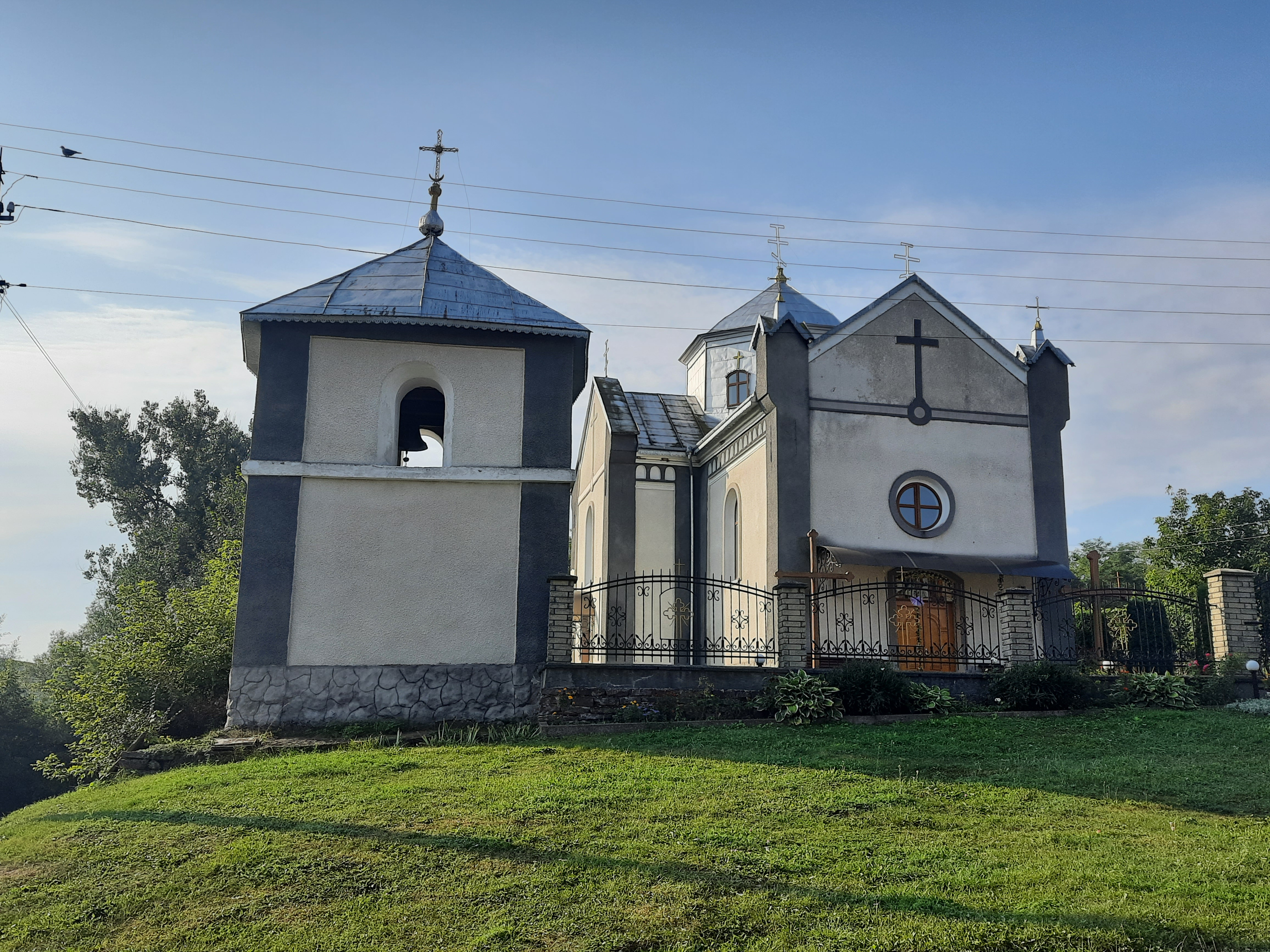
Church of the Assumption of the Blessed Virgin Mary (1876) Holovchyntsi, Chortkiv district, Ternopil region.

Holovchyntsi (Ukrainian: Головчинці) is a village in Tovste settlement hromada, Chortkiv Raion, Ternopil Oblast, Ukraine.

== History ==
The first written mention is from 1486.

After the liquidation of the Zalishchyky Raion on 19 July 2020, the village became part of the Chortkiv Raion.

== Religion ==
- Church of the Assumption (1876, brick; restored in 1927).

== Sources ==
- (in Ukrainian) Олійник В., Уніят, В., Головчинці // Ternopil Encyclopedic Dictionary: in 4 v. / editorial board: H. Yavorskyi and other, Ternopil: "Zbruch", 2004, V. 1: А—Й, S. 383. — ISBN 966-528-197-6.
- "Hołowczyńce (pow.zaleszczycki)". Geographical Dictionary of the Kingdom of Poland (in Polish). 3. Warszawa: Kasa im. Józefa Mianowskiego. 1882. p. 109.
