= Anhelivka, Chortkiv Raion, Ternopil Oblast =

Rural locality in Ternopil Oblast, Ukraine

Anhelivka Ангелівка
- Location in Ternopil Oblast
- Coordinates: 48°51′14″N 25°40′23″E
- Country: Ukraine
- Oblast: Ternopil Oblast
- Raion: Chortkiv Raion
- Hromada: Tovste settlement hromada
- Time zone: UTC+2 (EET)
  - Summer (DST): UTC+3 (EEST)
- Postal code: 48630

Anhelivka (Ukrainian: Ангелівка) is a village in Tovste settlement hromada, Chortkiv Raion, Ternopil Oblast, Ukraine.

== History ==
The first written mention is from 1810.

After the liquidation of the Zalishchyky Raion on 19 July 2020, the village became part of the Chortkiv Raion.

== Religion ==
- Church of the Nativity of the Blessed Virgin Mary (OCU; 2003, UGCC).

== Sources ==
- (in Ukrainian) Мельничук Б., Уніят В., Ангелівка // Ternopil Encyclopedic Dictionary: in 4 v. / editorial board: H. Yavorskyi and other, Ternopil: "Zbruch", 2004, V. 1: А—Й, S. 36. — ISBN 966-528-197-6.
- "Anielówka". Geographical Dictionary of the Kingdom of Poland (in Polish). 1. Warszawa: Kasa im. Józefa Mianowskiego. 1880. p. 38.
