= Podillia, Chortkiv Raion, Ternopil Oblast =

Rural locality in Ternopil Oblast, Ukraine

Podillia Поділля
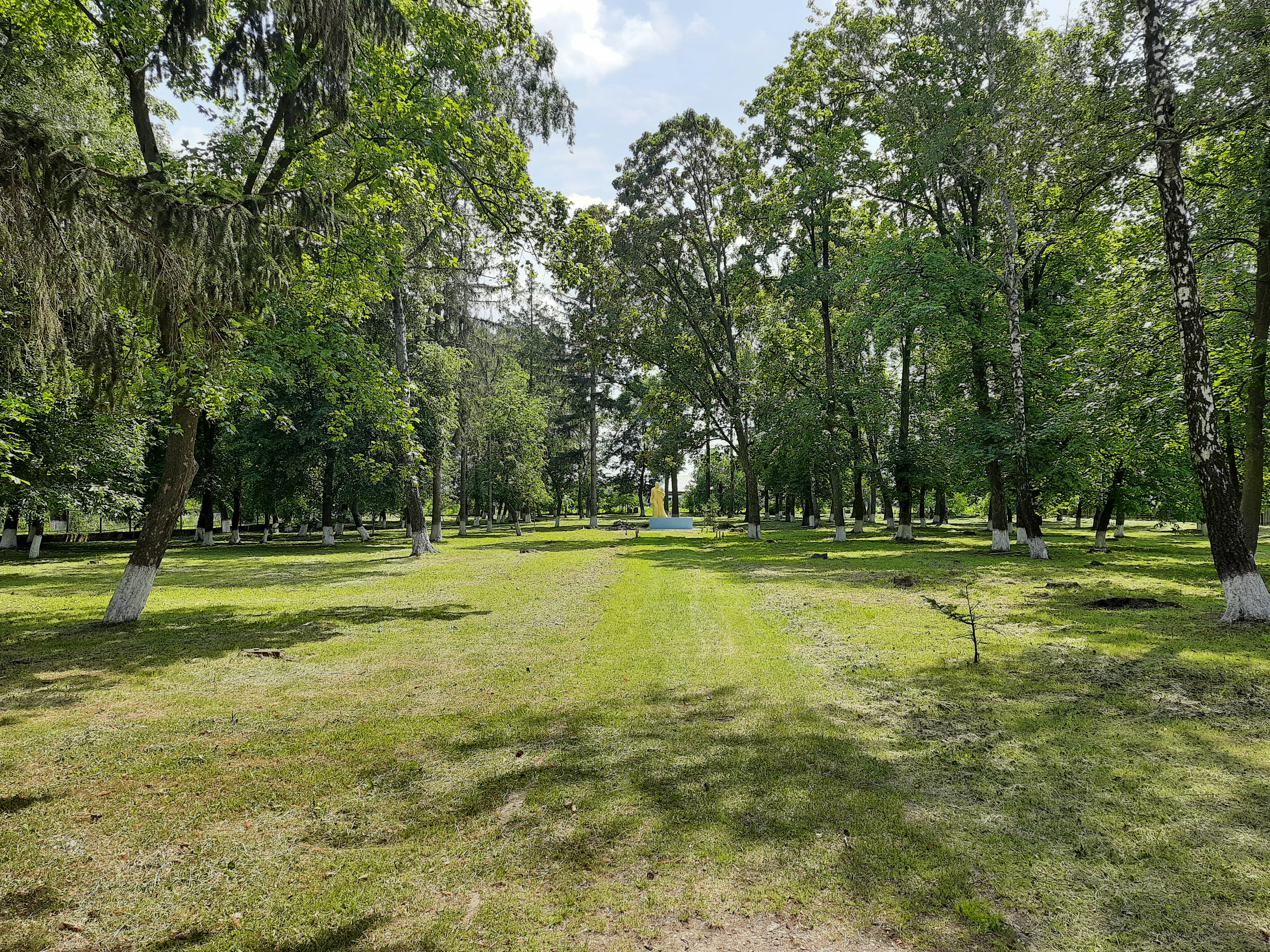
- Park of the village of Podillya. Chortkiv district, Ternopil region

- Location in Ternopil Oblast
- Coordinates: 48°51′32″N 25°36′44″E
- Country: Ukraine
- Oblast: Ternopil Oblast
- Raion: Chortkiv Raion
- Hromada: Tovste settlement hromada
- Time zone: UTC+2 (EET)
  - Summer (DST): UTC+3 (EEST)
- Postal code: 48613

Podillia (Ukrainian: Поділля) is a village in Tovste settlement hromada, Chortkiv Raion, Ternopil Oblast, Ukraine.

== History ==
The first written mention of Podillia dates back to 1469.

After the liquidation of the Zalishchyky Raion on 19 July 2020, the village became part of the Chortkiv Raion.

== Religion ==
- Church of the Position of the Holy Virgin's Belt (1909, brick),
- Church of All Saints of the Ukrainian People (1922; rebuilt from a Roman Catholic church).

== Sources ==
- (in Ukrainian) Ландяк В., Уніят В., Поділля // Ternopil Encyclopedic Dictionary: in 4 v. / editorial board: H. Yavorskyi and other, Ternopil: "Zbruch", 2008, V. 3: П—Я, S. 101—102. — ISBN 978-966-528-279-2.
- "Capowce". Geographical Dictionary of the Kingdom of Poland (in Polish). 1. Warszawa: Kasa im. Józefa Mianowskiego. 1880. p. 526.
