= Dorohychivka =

Rural locality in Ternopil Oblast, Ukraine

Dorohychivka Дорогичівка
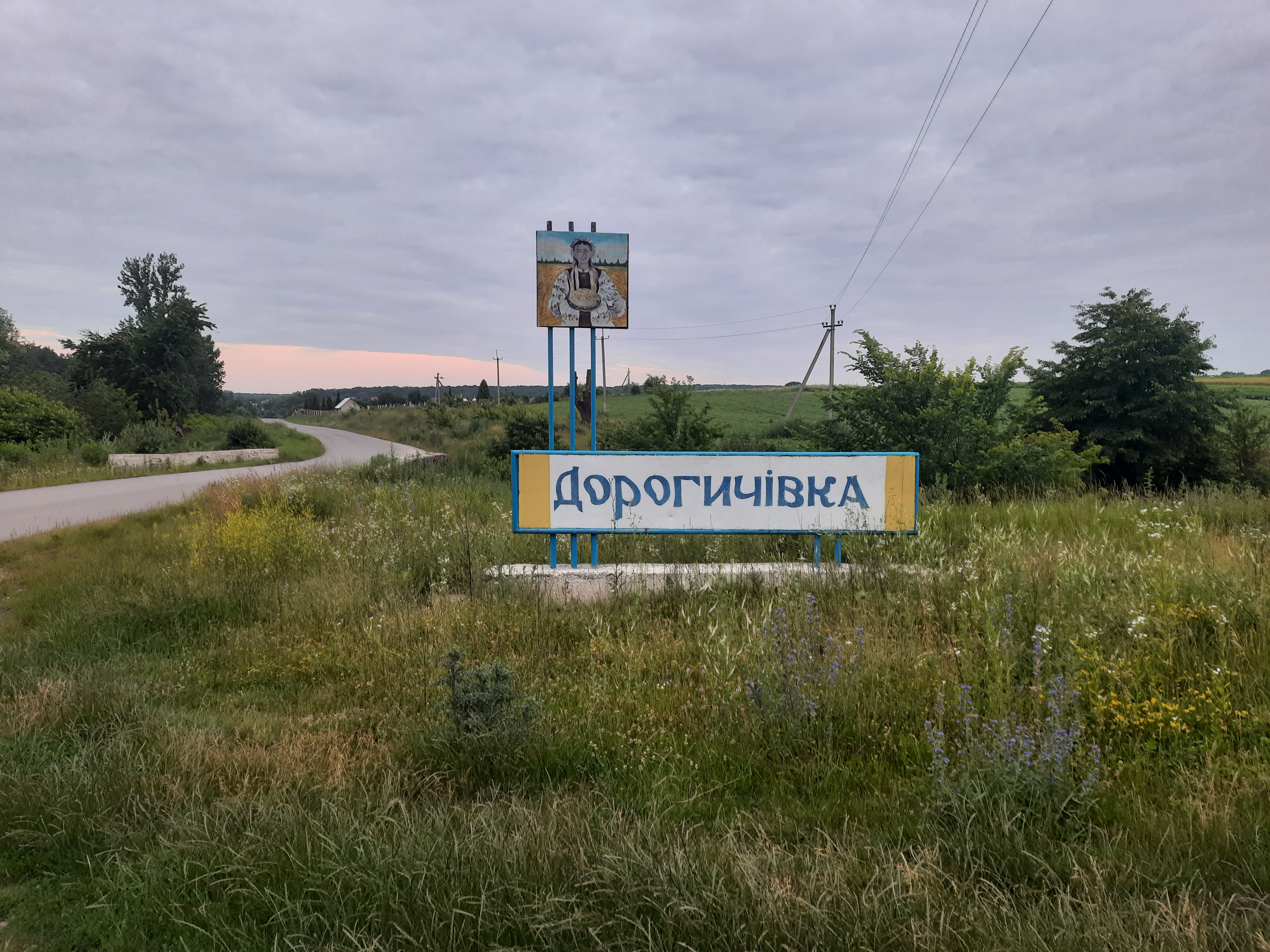
- Entrance sign to Dorohychivka

- Location in Ternopil Oblast
- Coordinates: 48°51′05″N 25°31′03″E
- Country: Ukraine
- Oblast: Ternopil Oblast
- Raion: Chortkiv Raion
- Hromada: Tovste settlement hromada
- Time zone: UTC+2 (EET)
  - Summer (DST): UTC+3 (EEST)
- Postal code: 48621

Dorohychivka (Ukrainian: Дорогичівка) is a village in Tovste settlement hromada, Chortkiv Raion, Ternopil Oblast, Ukraine.

== History ==
The first written mention is from 1544.

After the liquidation of the Zalishchyky Raion on 19 July 2020, the village became part of the Chortkiv Raion.

In the late 19th century, when the village was known by its Polish name Drohiczówka, a lime works (Kalkbrennereien) operated there, owned by Leont. Wybrzenowski, as recorded in the Galicia Business Directory of 1891.

== Jewish community ==
According to Where Once We Walked: A Guide to the Jewish Communities Destroyed in the Holocaust (2002), Dorohychivka (Polish: Drohiczówka) was home to a Jewish community prior to the Second World War. This community, like many others in the region, was destroyed during the Holocaust.

Archival records further document individual Jewish residents of Dorohychivka. For example, Chajm Skalka (later known as Herman Skalka) emigrated from Drohiczówka in 1904 at the age of 15, according to the Hamburg Passenger Lists. He later established himself as a grocer in Brooklyn, New York.

== Religion ==
- Church of the Blessed Virgin Mary (1818; brick, OCU; 1999; brick, UGCC).

== Sources ==
- (in Ukrainian) Бігус М., Тимчасюк І., Дорогичівка // Ternopil Encyclopedic Dictionary: in 4 v. / editorial board: H. Yavorskyi and other, Ternopil: "Zbruch", 2004, V. 1: А—Й, S. 523. — ISBN 966-528-197-6.
- "Drohiczówka". Geographical Dictionary of the Kingdom of Poland (in Polish). 2. Warszawa: Kasa im. Józefa Mianowskiego. 1881. p. 149.
