= Antoniv, Ternopil Oblast =

Village in Ternopil Oblast, Ukraine

Antoniv Антонів
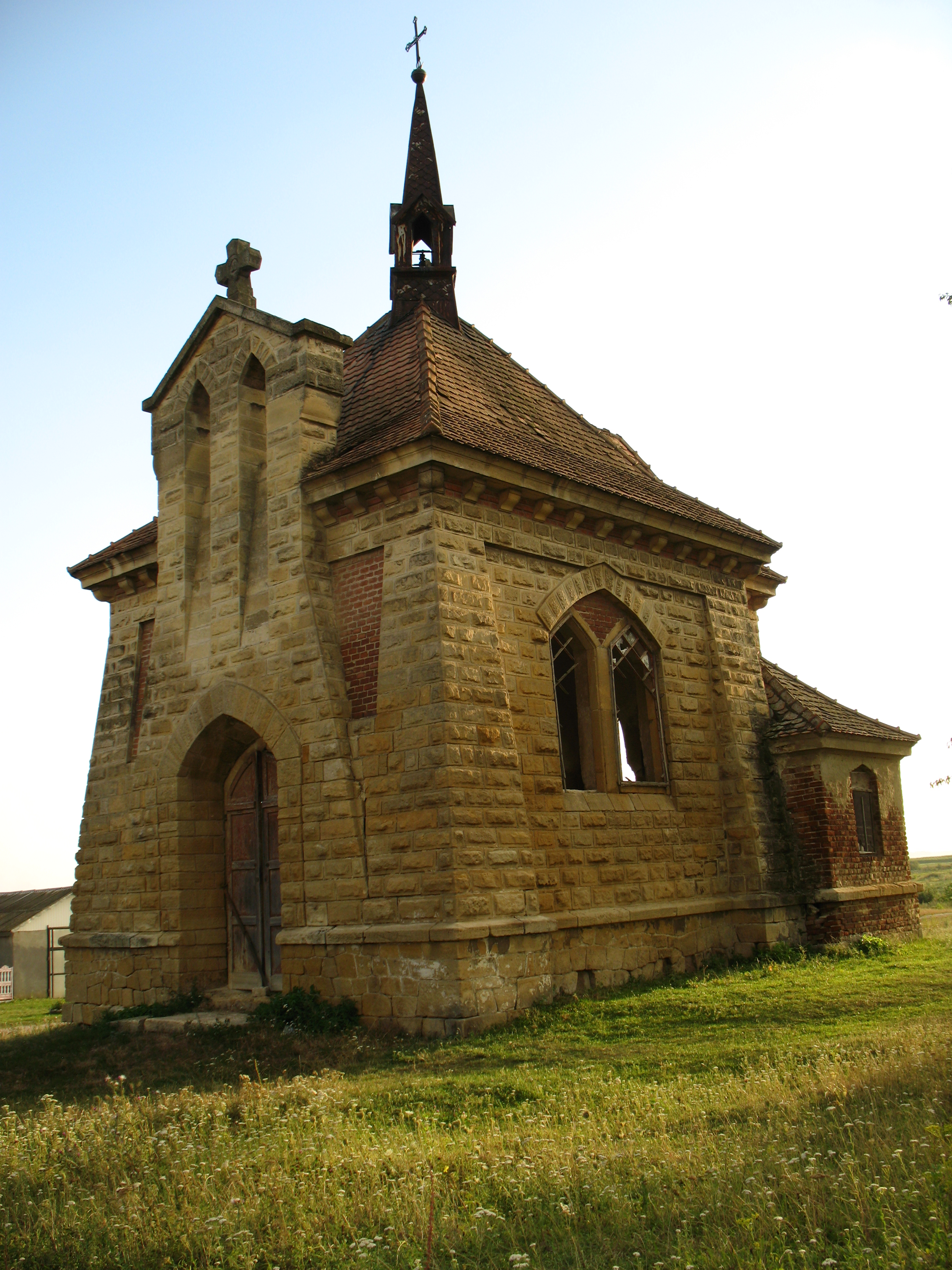

- Location in Ternopil Oblast
- Coordinates: 48°52′39″N 25°41′16″E
- Country: Ukraine
- Oblast: Ternopil Oblast
- Raion: Chortkiv Raion
- Hromada: Tovste Hromada
- Postal code: 48544

Antoniv (Ukrainian: Антонів) is a village in Tovste settlement hromada, Chortkiv Raion, Ternopil Oblast, Ukraine.

== History ==
The first written mention is from the end of the XVIII century.

== Religion ==
- Greek Catholic Church of the Intercession (1884, brick, architect F. Zakhareshevych, restored in 1989)
- Roman Catholic Church (1936, inactive, brick)
