= Solone, Ternopil Oblast =

Rural locality in Ternopil Oblast, Ukraine

Solone Солоне
- Location in Ternopil Oblast
- Coordinates: 48°49′18″N 25°40′46″E
- Country: Ukraine
- Oblast: Ternopil Oblast
- Raion: Chortkiv Raion
- Hromada: Tovste settlement hromada
- Time zone: UTC+2 (EET)
  - Summer (DST): UTC+3 (EEST)
- Postal code: 48453

Solone (Ukrainian: Солоне) is a village in Tovste settlement hromada, Chortkiv Raion, Ternopil Oblast, Ukraine.

== History ==
The first written mention is from 1724.

After the liquidation of the Zalishchyky Raion on 19 July 2020, the village became part of the Chortkiv Raion.

== Religion ==
- Church of the Holy Trinity (1860, wooden, UGCC),
- Church of the Holy Spirit (1909, converted from a church, OCU).

== Sources ==
- (in Ukrainian) Павлик Я., Солоне // Ternopil Encyclopedic Dictionary: in 4 v. / editorial board: H. Yavorskyi and other, Ternopil: "Zbruch", 2008, V. 3: П—Я, S. 310–311. — ISBN 978-966-528-279-2.
- "Słone (3)". Geographical Dictionary of the Kingdom of Poland (in Polish). 10. Warszawa: Kasa im. Józefa Mianowskiego. 1889. p. 821.
