= Shypivtsi =

Rural locality in Ternopil Oblast, Ukraine

Shypivtsi Шипівці
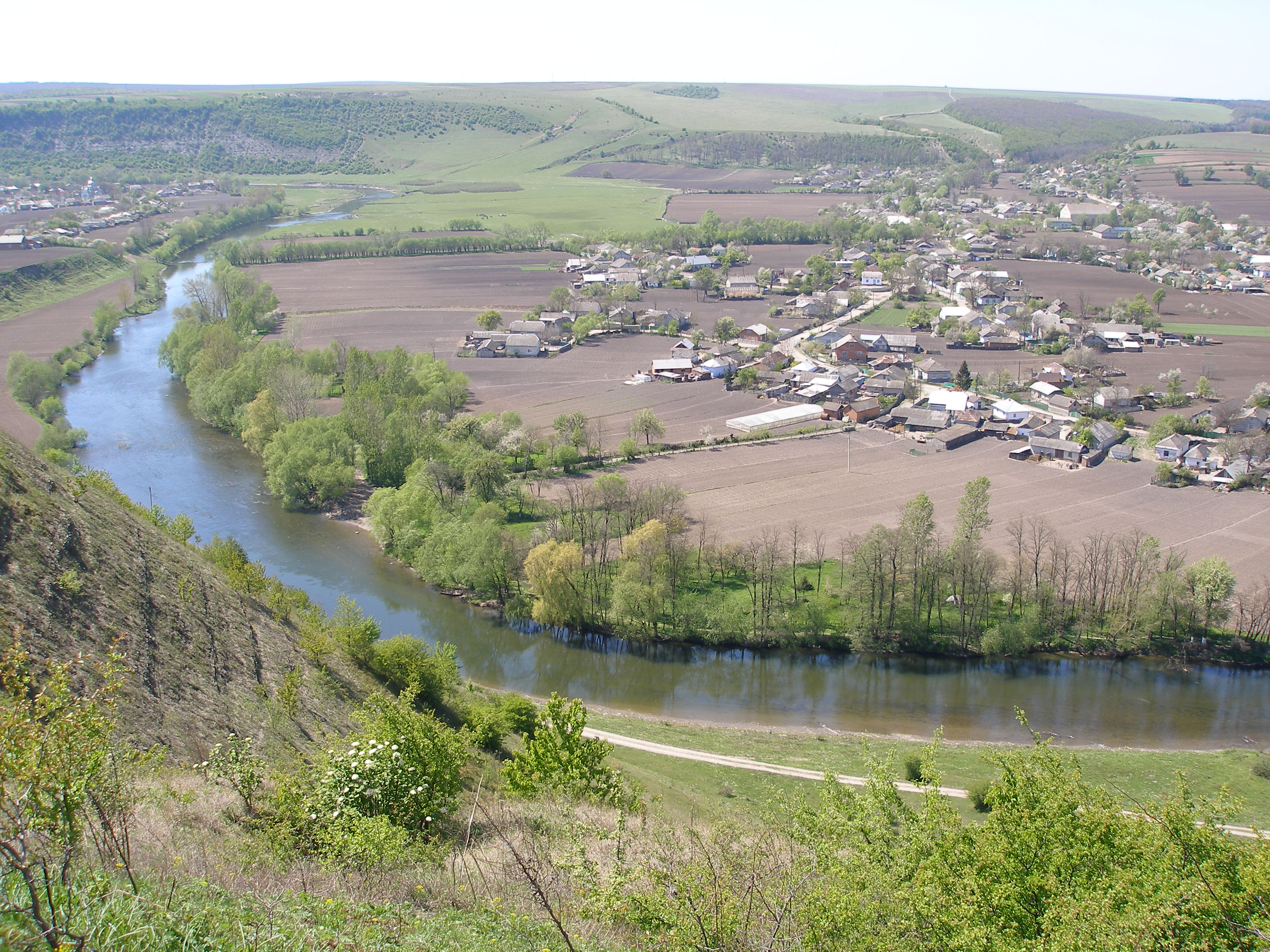

- Location in Ternopil Oblast
- Coordinates: 48°49′48″N 25°49′17″E
- Country: Ukraine
- Oblast: Ternopil Oblast
- Raion: Chortkiv Raion
- Hromada: Tovste settlement hromada
- Time zone: UTC+2 (EET)
  - Summer (DST): UTC+3 (EEST)
- Postal code: 48684

Shypivtsi (Ukrainian: Шипівці) is a village in Tovste settlement hromada, Chortkiv Raion, Ternopil Oblast, Ukraine.

== History ==
The first writings the mentions the village dates back to 1453 (according to local historian Petro Siredzhuk – 1530).

After the liquidation of the Zalishchyky Raion on 19 July 2020, the village became part of the Chortkiv Raion.

== Religion ==
- St. Michael's church (1867, brick),
- Roman Catholic Church of the Divine Mercy (1906).

== Sources ==
- (in Ukrainian) Гуцал П., Олійник В., Шипівці // Ternopil Encyclopedic Dictionary: in 4 v. / editorial board: H. Yavorskyi and other, Ternopil: "Zbruch", 2008, V. 3: П—Я, S. 638—639. — ISBN 978-966-528-279-2.
- "Szypowce". Geographical Dictionary of the Kingdom of Poland (in Polish). 12. Warszawa: Kasa im. Józefa Mianowskiego. 1892. p. 125.
