= Tovste settlement hromada =

Hromada in Ternopil Oblast, Ukraine

Tovste settlement hromada Товстенська селищна громада
- hromada
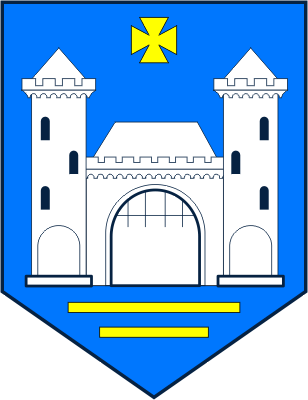
- Seal

- Location within Ternopil Oblast Location within Ukraine
- Coordinates: 48°50′47″N 25°43′31″E
- Country: Ukraine
- Oblast: Ternopil Oblast
- Raion: Chortkiv Raion
- Administrative center: Tovste

Government
  - Hromada head: Ivan Prodanyk

Area
  - Total: 340.0 km^{2} (131.3 sq mi)

Population (2022)
  - Total: 18,074
- Urban-type settlement: 1
- Villages: 25
- Website: tovstenska-gromada.gov.ua

Tovste settlement hromada (Ukrainian: Товстеньківська селищна територіальна громада, romanized: Tovstenkivska selyshchna terytorialna hromada is a hromada in Ukraine, in Chortkiv Raion of Ternopil Oblast. The administrative center is the urban-type settlement of Tovste. Its population is 18,074 (2022 estimate)

It was formed on 22 November 2017 by amalgamation of Tovste town council and Holovchyntsi village council of Zalishchyky Raion.

== Settlements ==
The hromada consists of 1 urban-type settlement (Tovste) and 25 villages:

- Anhelivka
- Antoniv
- Buriakivka
- Vorvulyntsi
- Hynkivtsi
- Holovchyntsi
- Dorohychivka
- Korolivka
- Koshylivtsi
- Lysivtsi
- Lytiachi
- Nahoriany
- Nyrkiv
- Podillia
- Popivtsi
- Rozhanivka
- Sadky
- Svershkivtsi
- Svydova
- Slobidka
- Solone
- Ustechko
- Khmeleva
- Shypivtsi
- Shutromyntsi
