= Svershkivtsi =

Rural locality in Ternopil Oblast, Ukraine

Svershkivtsi Свершківці
- Location in Ternopil Oblast
- Coordinates: 48°52′43″N 25°28′43″E
- Country: Ukraine
- Oblast: Ternopil Oblast
- Raion: Chortkiv Raion
- Hromada: Tovste settlement hromada
- Time zone: UTC+2 (EET)
  - Summer (DST): UTC+3 (EEST)
- Postal code: 48630

Svershkivtsi (Ukrainian: Свершківці) is a village in Tovste settlement hromada, Chortkiv Raion, Ternopil Oblast, Ukraine.

== History ==
The first written mention is from 1493.

After the liquidation of the Zalishchyky Raion on 19 July 2020, the village became part of the Chortkiv Raion.

== Religion ==
- Church of the Assumption (1894, brick).

== Sources ==
- (in Ukrainian) Головецький М., Мельничук Б., Свершківці // Ternopil Encyclopedic Dictionary: in 4 v. / editorial board: H. Yavorskyi and other, Ternopil: "Zbruch", 2008, V. 3: П—Я, S. 233. — ISBN 978-966-528-279-2.
- "Świerszkowce". Geographical Dictionary of the Kingdom of Poland (in Polish). 11. Warszawa: Kasa im. Józefa Mianowskiego. 1890. p. 678.
