= Shutromyntsi =

Rural locality in Ternopil Oblast, Ukraine

Coordinates: 48°49′N 25°32′E

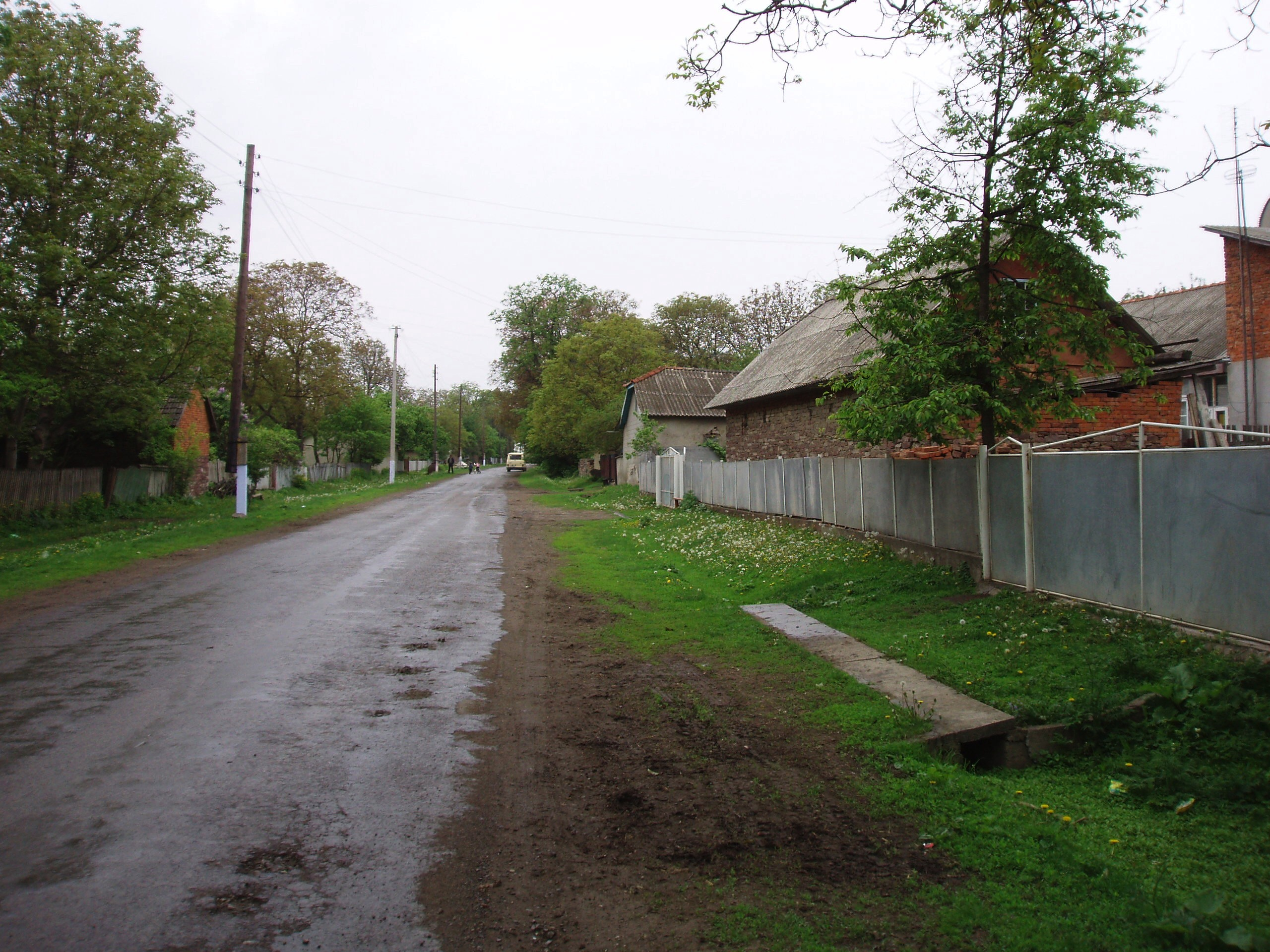
Main street in Shutromyntsi

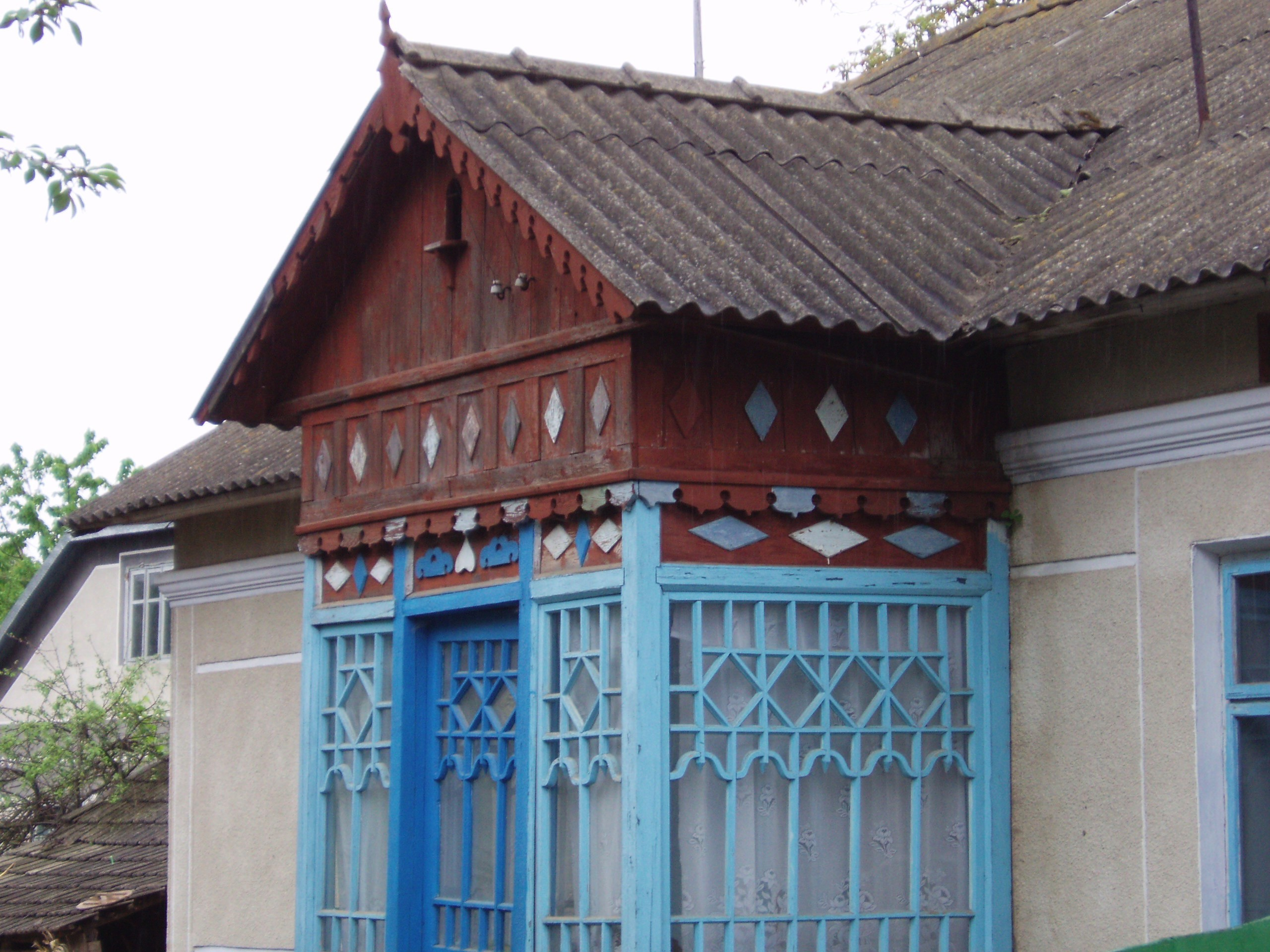
House in Shutromyntsi

Shutromyntsi (Ukrainian: Шутроминці) is a village in Chortkiv Raion of Ternopil Oblast, Western Ukraine. It is about 50 km north of Zalischyky. It belongs to Tovste settlement hromada, one of the hromadas of Ukraine.

Until 18 July 2020, Shutromyntsi belonged to Zalishchyky Raion. The raion was abolished in July 2020 as part of the administrative reform of Ukraine, which reduced the number of raions of Ternopil Oblast to three. The area of Zalishchyky Raion was merged into Chortkiv Raion.
