= Khmeleva =

Rural locality in Ternopil Oblast, Ukraine

Khmeleva Хмелева
- Village
- Interactive map of Khmeleva
- Coordinates: 48°52′00″N 25°28′48″E
- Country: Ukraine
- Oblast: Ternopil Oblast
- District: Chortkiv Raion
- Established: 1456

Area
  - Total: 13.650 km^{2} (5.270 sq mi)

Population
  - Total: 464
  - Urban density: 33.99/km^{2} (88.0/sq mi)
- Time zone: UTC+2 (EET)
  - Summer (DST): UTC+3 (EEST)
- Postal code: 48683
- Area code: +380 3554

Khmeleva (Ukrainian: Хмелева, Polish: Chmielowa) is a village located on the Dnister River in Chortkiv Raion of Ternopil Oblast, in western Ukraine. Khmeleva is the administrative center of the village council, which also includes the village of Svershkivtsi. It belongs to Tovste settlement hromada, one of the hromadas of Ukraine.

Population of the village as of 2007 was 442.

Until 18 July 2020, Khmeleva belonged to Zalishchyky Raion. The raion was abolished in July 2020 as part of the administrative reform of Ukraine, which reduced the number of raions of Ternopil Oblast to three. The area of Zalishchyky Raion was merged into Chortkiv Raion.

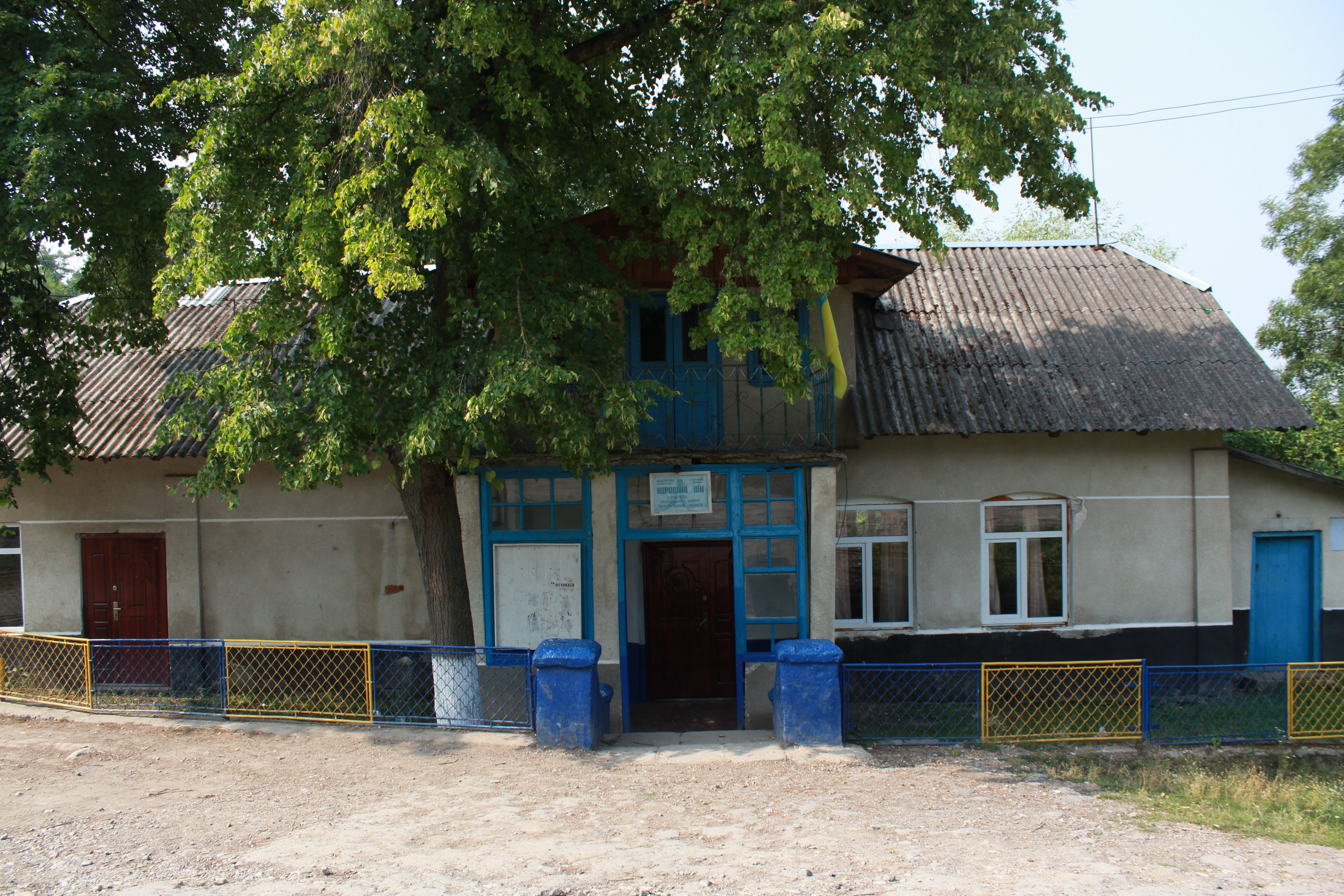
People's house

== Notable people ==
- Yakub Holovatsky, writer, folklorist, Slavist scholar
