= Rozhanivka =

Rural locality in Ternopil Oblast, Ukraine

Rozhanivka Рожанівка
- Location in Ternopil Oblast
- Coordinates: 48°50′10″N 25°42′35″E
- Country: Ukraine
- Oblast: Ternopil Oblast
- Raion: Chortkiv Raion
- Hromada: Tovste settlement hromada
- Time zone: UTC+2 (EET)
  - Summer (DST): UTC+3 (EEST)
- Postal code: 48453

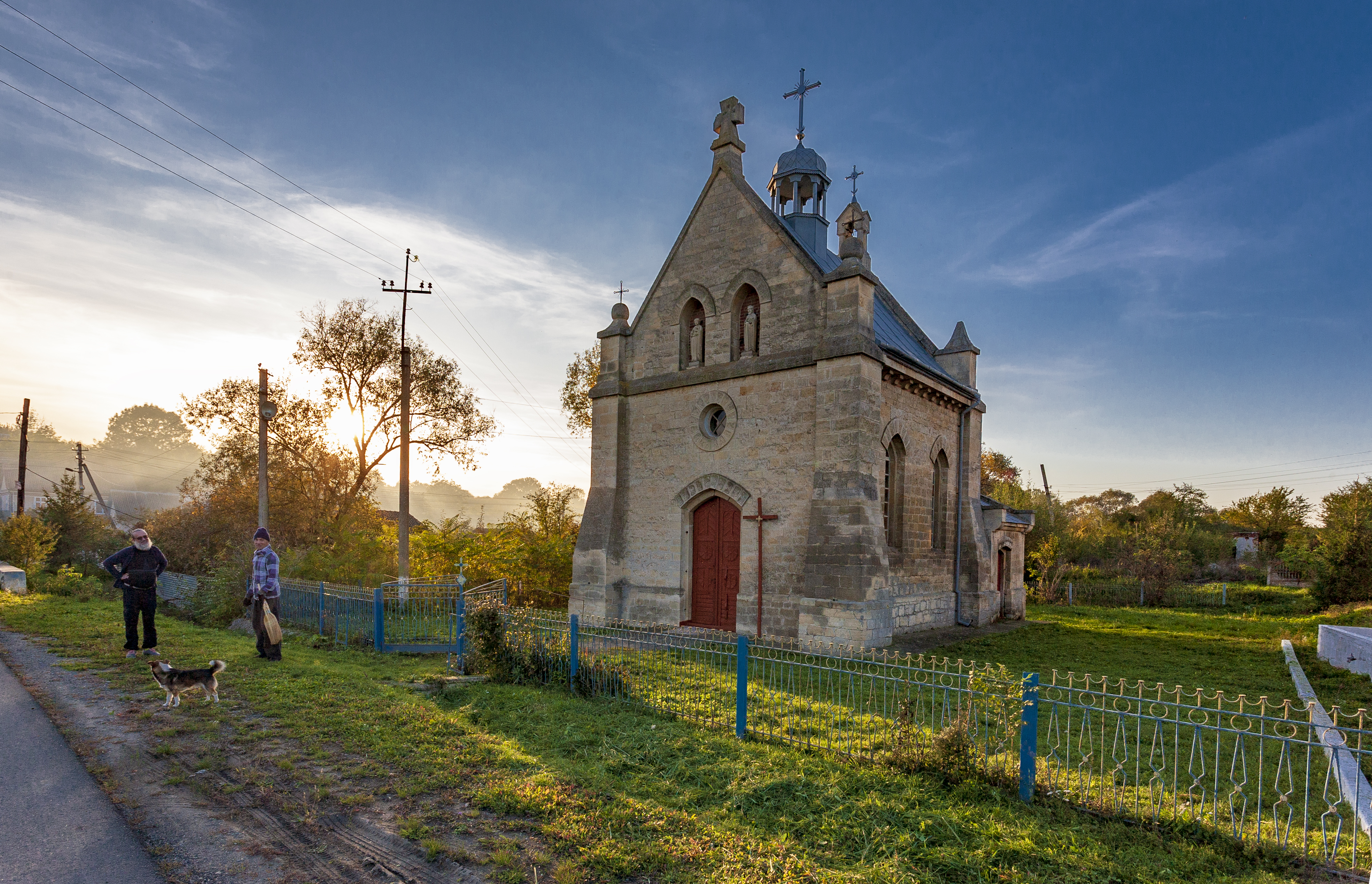
Rozjanvika Kostel

Rozhanivka (Ukrainian: Рожанівка) is a village in Tovste settlement hromada, Chortkiv Raion, Ternopil Oblast, Ukraine.

== History ==
The first written mention is from 1552.

After the liquidation of the Zalishchyky Raion on 19 July 2020, the village became part of the Chortkiv Raion.

== Religion ==
- St. Volodymyr's Church (1998, brick, OCU),
- Church of the Holy Eucharist (2005, brick, UGCC);
- Church of Peter and Paul (1933, 1990, restored and services resumed, RCC);
- St. Nicholas Chapel (1890, wooden).

== Sources ==
- (in Ukrainian) Ободяк К., Павлик З., Павлик, Я., Рожанівка // Ternopil Encyclopedic Dictionary: in 4 v. / editorial board: H. Yavorskyi and other, Ternopil: "Zbruch", 2008, V. 3: П—Я, S. 186–187. — ISBN 978-966-528-279-2.
- "Rożanówka (2)". Geographical Dictionary of the Kingdom of Poland (in Polish). 9. Warszawa: Kasa im. Józefa Mianowskiego. 1888. p. 857.
