= Ustechko, Chortkiv Raion, Ternopil Oblast =

Rural locality in Ternopil Oblast, Ukraine

Ustechko Устечко
- Location in Ternopil Oblast
- Coordinates: 48°46′6″N 25°36′12″E
- Country: Ukraine
- Oblast: Ternopil Oblast
- Raion: Chortkiv Raion
- Hromada: Tovste settlement hromada
- Time zone: UTC+2 (EET)
  - Summer (DST): UTC+3 (EEST)
- Postal code: 48634

Ustechko (Ukrainian: Устечко, Polish: Uścieczko, Yiddish: איסטיטשקע, romanized: Istitshke) is a village in Tovste settlement hromada, Chortkiv Raion, Ternopil Oblast, Ukraine.

== History ==
The first written mention is from 1414.

After the liquidation of the Zalishchyky Raion on 19 July 2020, the village became part of the Chortkiv Raion.

== Religion ==
- Saint Paraskeva church (1881, brick; restored in 1904, UGCC),
- Roman Catholic church (1876, RCC).

== Sources ==
- (in Ukrainian) Бабин Л., Дубецький І., Олійник В., Устечко // Ternopil Encyclopedic Dictionary: in 4 v. / editorial board: H. Yavorskyi and other, Ternopil: "Zbruch", 2008, V. 3: П—Я, S. 499. — ISBN 978-966-528-279-2.
- "Uścieczko". Geographical Dictionary of the Kingdom of Poland (in Polish). 12. Warszawa: Kasa im. Józefa Mianowskiego. 1892. p. 834–835.
