= Sadky, Chortkiv Raion, Ternopil Oblast =

Rural locality in Ternopil Oblast, Ukraine

Sadky Садки
- Location in Ternopil Oblast
- Coordinates: 48°51′2″N 25°33′46″E
- Country: Ukraine
- Oblast: Ternopil Oblast
- Raion: Chortkiv Raion
- Hromada: Tovste settlement hromada
- Time zone: UTC+2 (EET)
  - Summer (DST): UTC+3 (EEST)
- Postal code: 48622

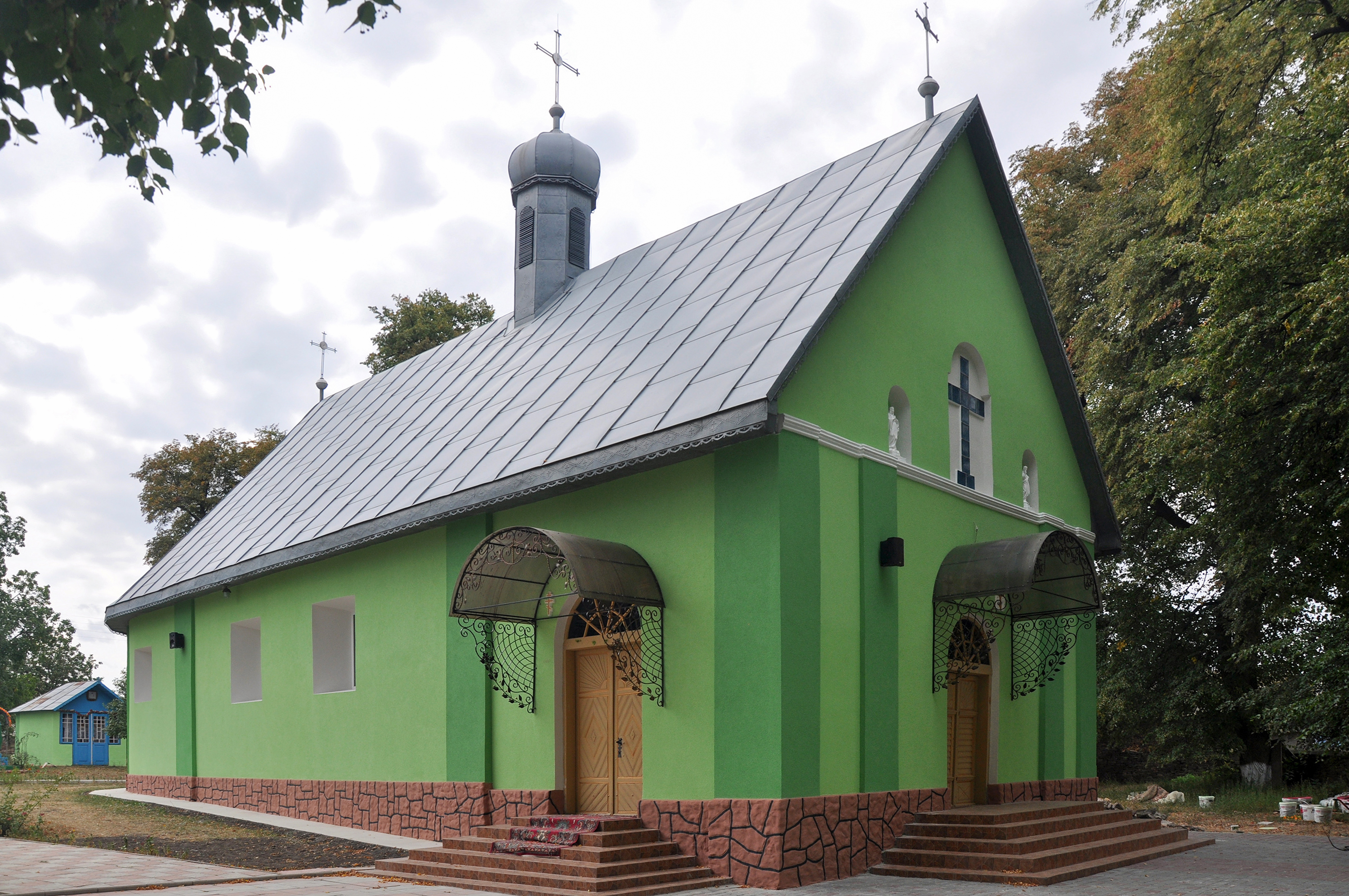
Church of the Resurrection of Christ, Sadky, Ternopil Oblast, Ukraine

Sadky (Ukrainian: Садки) is a village in Tovste settlement hromada, Chortkiv Raion, Ternopil Oblast, Ukraine.

== History ==
It was first mentioned in writings in 1469.

After the liquidation of the Zalishchyky Raion on 19 July 2020, the village became part of the Chortkiv Raion.

== Religion ==
- Church of the Resurrection (1880, brick, OCU; UGCC). It is a Christian Catholic community.

== Sources ==
- (in Ukrainian) Дем'янів, В., Садки // Ternopil Encyclopedic Dictionary: in 4 v. / editorial board: H. Yavorskyi and other, Ternopil: "Zbruch", 2008, V. 3: П—Я, S. 221. — ISBN 978-966-528-279-2.
- "Sadki (9)". Geographical Dictionary of the Kingdom of Poland (in Polish). 10. Warszawa: Kasa im. Józefa Mianowskiego. 1889. p. 197.
