= Battle of the Strypa River =

World War I battle

- Part of the Eastern Front of World War I
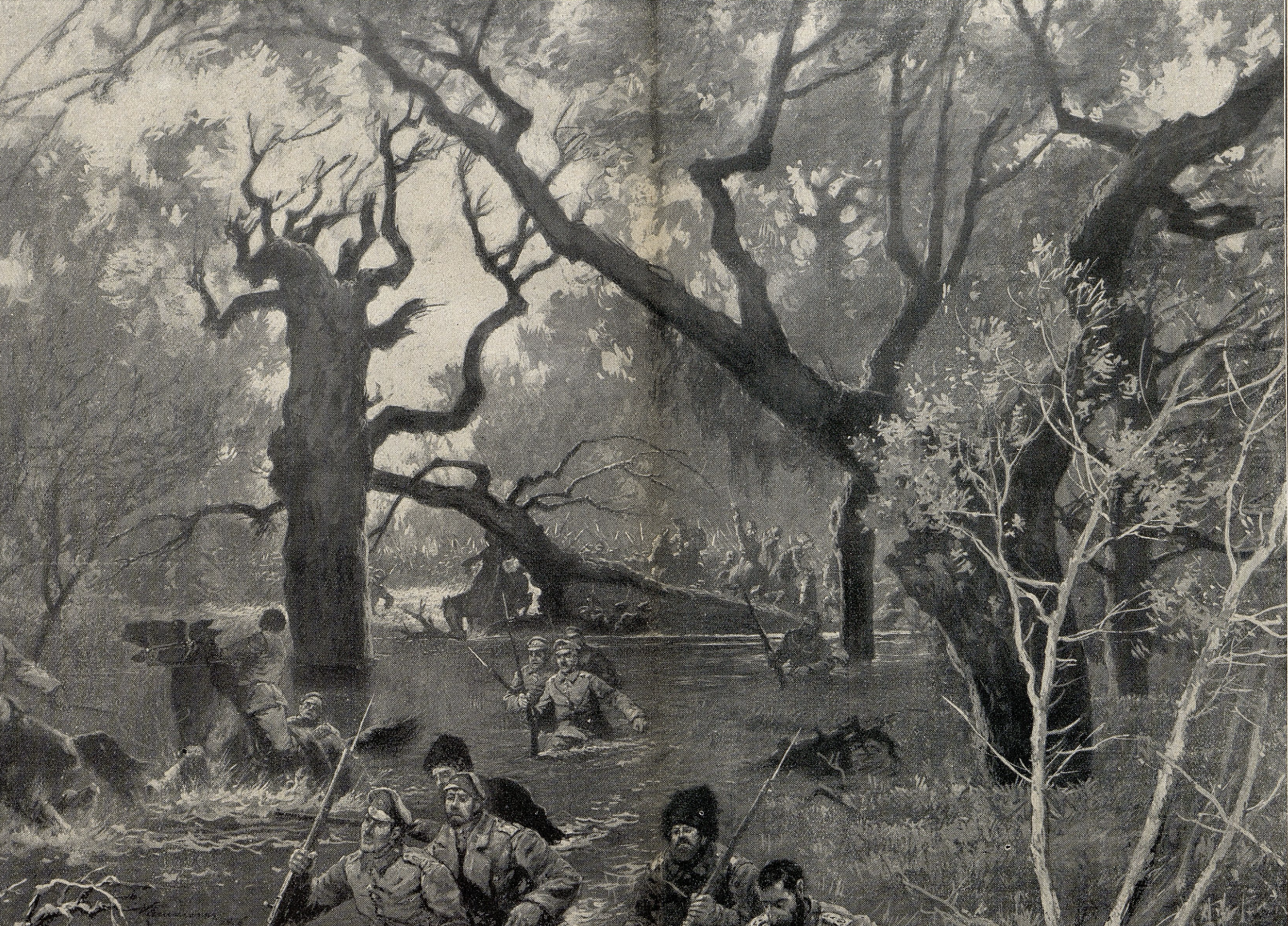
- Russian troops advance in the forest near Okana during the battle of Strypa
Date	27 December 1915 – 26 January 1916
Location	Strypa River, Austria-Hungary (now Ukraine)
Result	Central Powers victory

Belligerents
Russian Empire	German Empire; Austria-Hungary

Commanders and leaders
Dmitry Shcherbachev; Platon Lechitsky	(Austria-Hungary) Karl von Pflanzer-Baltin (German Empire) Felix Graf von Bothmer

Units involved
7th Army; 9th Army	(Austria-Hungary) 7th Army (German Empire) Army of the Bug: (German Empire) II Royal Bavarian Reserve Corps

Strength
480,000	450,000

Casualties and losses
46,803 to 72,759	17,264

The Battle of the Strypa (German: Kampf auf der Strype) or Operation on the Strypa (Russian: Операция на Стрыпе) was a Russian offensive from December 27 [O.S. December 14] 1915 to January 26 [O.S. January 13] 1916, in Galicia, near the Strypa River. It ended with the victory of the Central Powers.

== Prelude ==
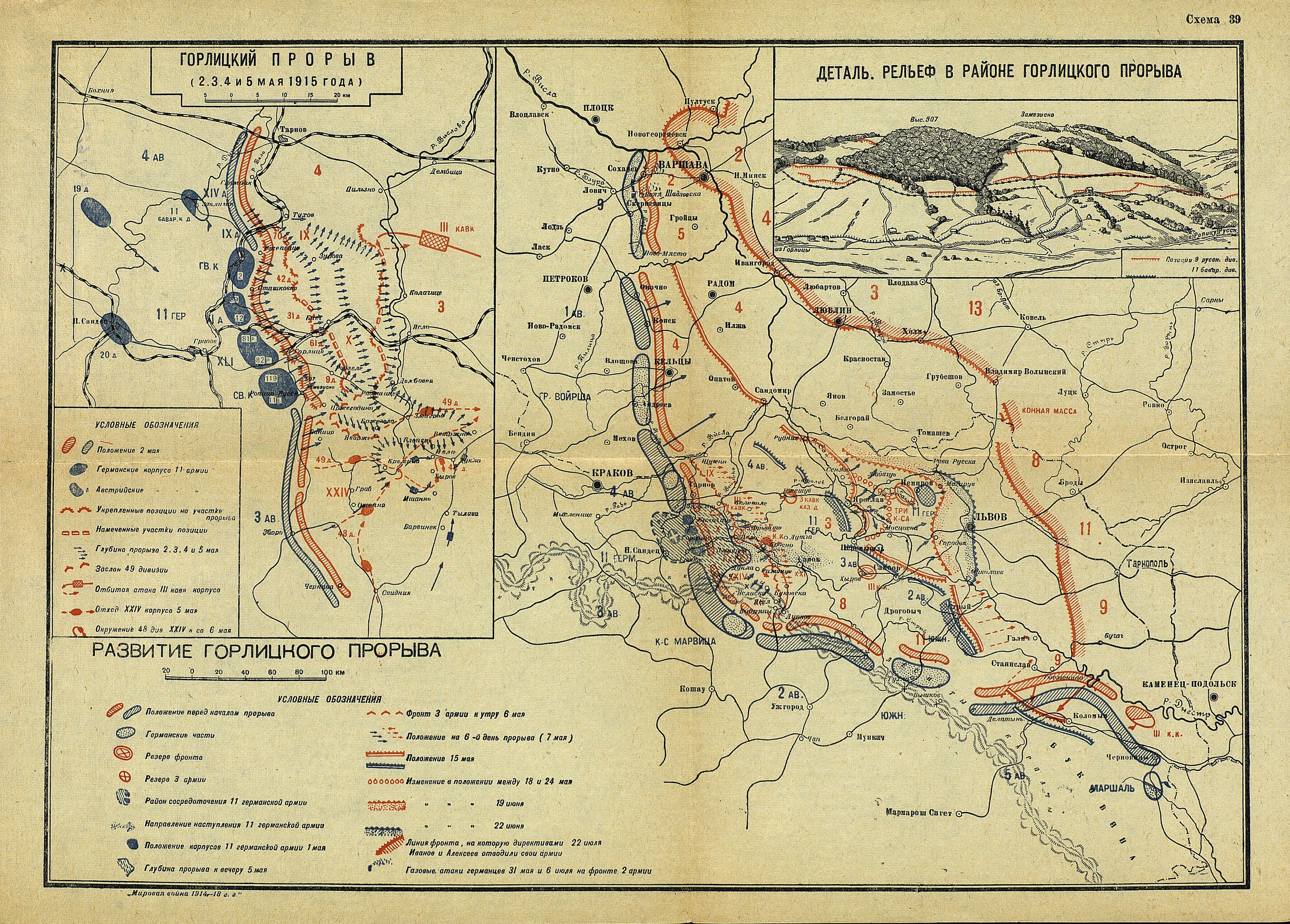
The retreat of Russian troops from Galicia

In the spring of 1915, a major offensive by the Central Powers began in Galicia and the Carpathians, which ended with an almost complete withdrawal of the Russians from this territory, but in the autumn, they launched several sharp counterattacks, which forced the Central Powers to make room for some as a result of intense battles.

== Reasons and preparation ==
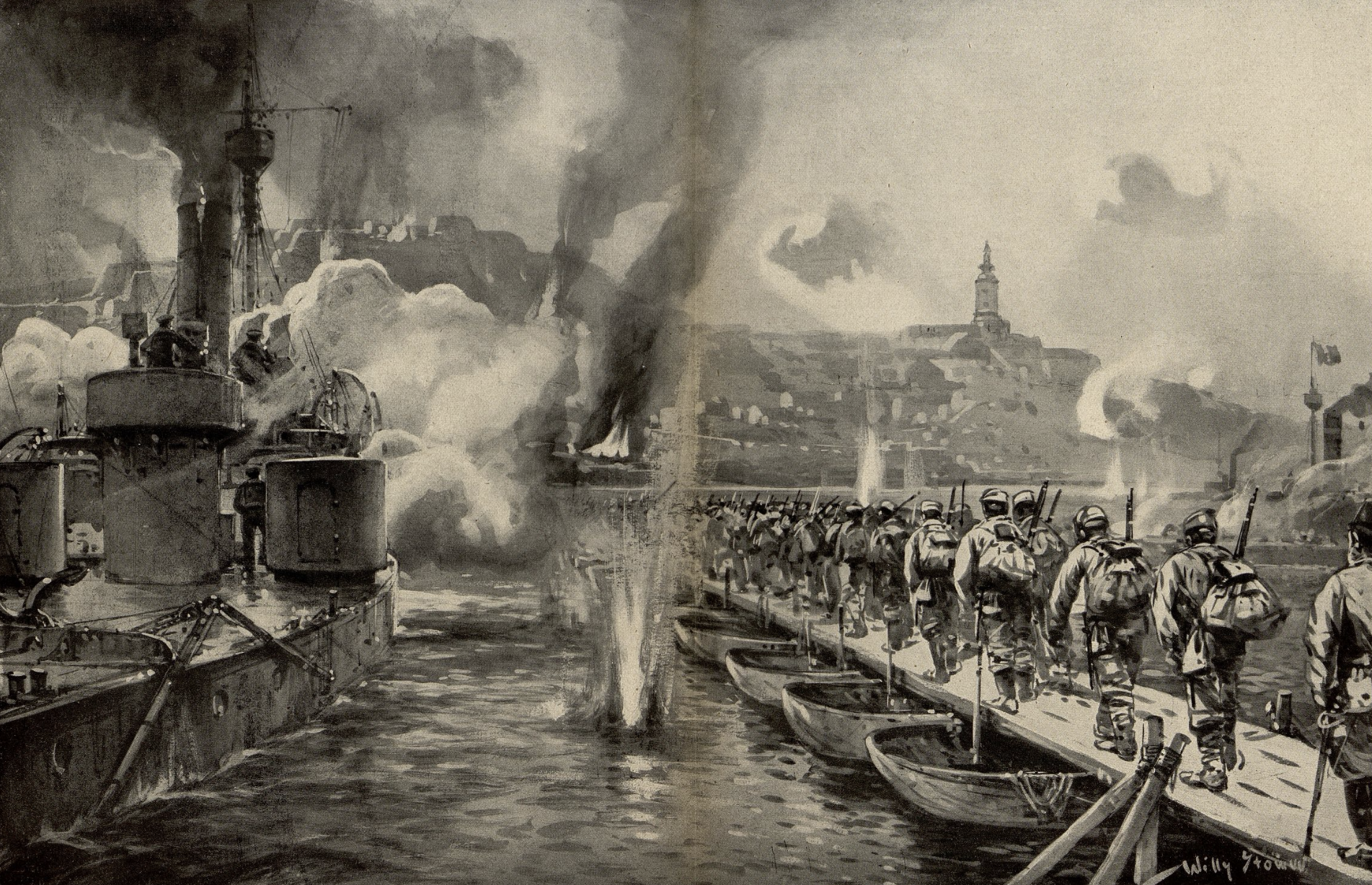
The offensive against Serbia

The main strategic task was to help Serbia, which was suffering a crushing defeat, and the 7th Army was created for this purpose.

The Russian forces were well equipped, new heavy artillery was delivered, but the positions of the Central Powers were better in this.

The Russians had a slightly numerical advantage in manpower. By the beginning of the battle, the Russians had 480,000 men and the Central Powers had 450,000. This was compensated by the strong fortified positions of the defenders, besides which, the narrowness of the front was also a problem.

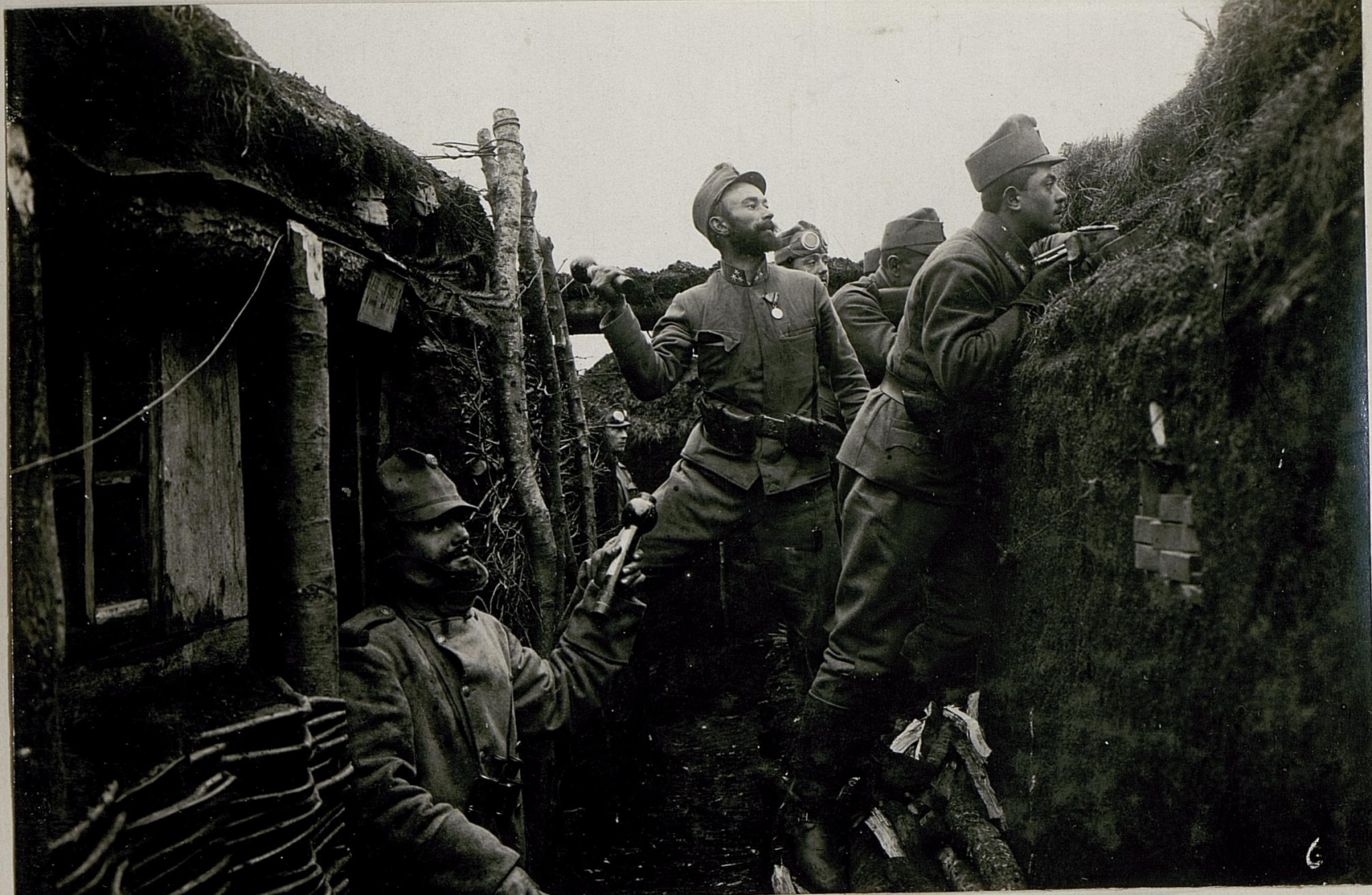
Austrian positions on the river

Initially, many hopes were not pinned on the operation, the command of the southwestern front set the main task to win space and strengthen the rear, if possible, to ease pressure on other sectors of the front. The main blow was dealt by the 7th Army, The troops of the 9th Army were supposed to cover it, the offensive began at different times and in different areas. The 9th Army attacked on December 14, and the 7th on December 16, this was done to distract the maneuver in order to ensure success for the main Russian formations. However, there was a lack of resources everywhere to break through such heavy defensive positions, but the Russian command put on the surprise factor. Also, the Russian command did not conduct reconnaissance, as this could arouse suspicion among the defenders, such an approach to a heavy offensive forced the advancing troops to attack blindly, which led to unnecessary casualties. The positions of the Central Powers were well manned, there were impenetrable forests and heights, as well as several rows of trenches.

The Russian command itself noted the quality of the trenches of the soldiers of the Central Powers; Alexei Brusilov wrote:

It must be admitted that the Austrians and Germans fortified themselves better than we did, more thoroughly, and it was much more convenient to live in their trenches than in ours. In addition to the fairly widespread use of reinforced concrete structures, they had electricity in many places, and dug-out rooms for soldiers and officers were installed.

== Battle ==
=== Actions of the 7th Army ===
In the main direction, the 2nd Army Corps had 84 guns, including 36 heavy guns, it is noted that this was not enough.

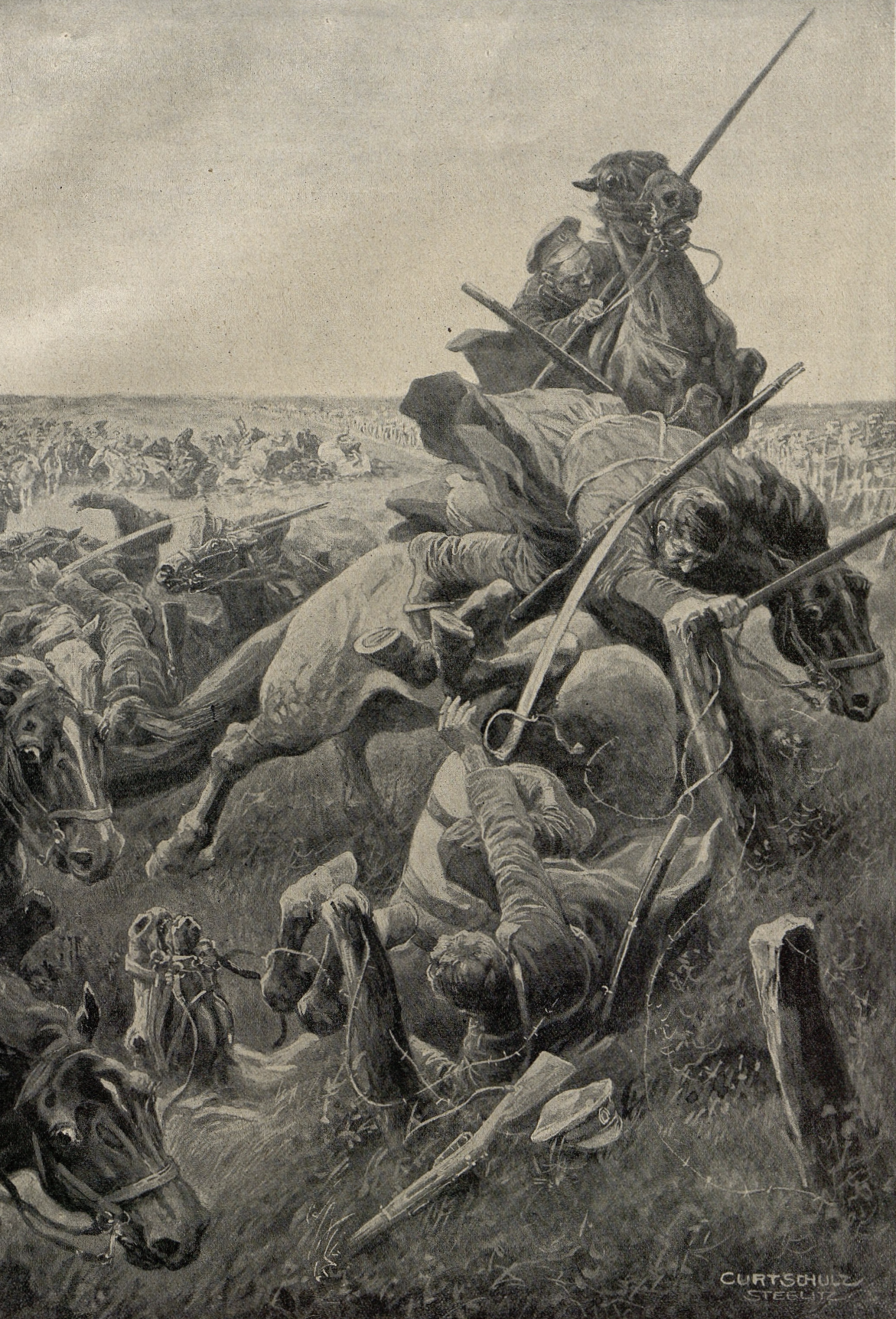
Unsuccessful attack of the Russian dragoons on the Strypa

However, due to the effect of surprise, the actions were successful in the early stages, the Russians captured several heights and 227 prisoners, however, due to poor reconnaissance, the regimental commanders thought they had broken through the main fortifications, which were 500 meters away, everywhere there was a lack of information. Nevertheless, another 263 Germans were taken. On December 17, attacks on the main German positions began, due to the uncoordinated actions of artillery and infantry, attacks were repulsed. A day later, they continued, due to heavy machine-gun fire only 2 companies managed to break into the advanced trenches, but without reinforcements they were cut off and almost completely died. Russian losses in three days 11,179 people. On December 22, Alekseyev sent a telegram to Nicholas II stating that the lack of information had affected the failures:

The operation that began found out that, despite the long close contact with the enemy, which allowed and required the most persistent study of its location, only a three-day heavy battle with large stones established that the enemy's position was strengthened extremely strongly, that local conditions were very used in the sense of cross-flank defense, that the wire fences have three lanes, one hundred There are several steps each, with strong dugouts between them for flanking, which, finally, the positions are strongly developed in depth. I consider it necessary to inform you of this and ask for orders to ensure the activities of intelligence officers and pilots... The observers were directed to the fullest possible, thorough study of the location of enemy positions, because only this knowledge ensures the successful formation of a battle plan, the choice of an attack point, the concentration of artillery, and protects from unnecessary losses and mistakes in the conduct of combat.

On December 21, the battle resumed, before that the Russians decided to collect enough intelligence, but some of it was immediately outdated, as the Central Powers received reinforcements. The offensive began on the entire front, however, due to the expectation of an attack, as well as a lack of artillery, the fighting immediately ended with catastrophic losses, the Russians lost 5,473 people at the wire fences. After the defensive success, some Austrian detachments tried to go on the offensive, but were repulsed, the battle turned into an artillery duel. Losses of the 7th Army for all time 24,828 people.

=== Actions of the 9th Army ===
The offensive of the 9th Army, which had previously successfully operated in the Dniester region, had only an auxiliary purpose and began two days earlier. The offensive went on almost in the same way as the main troops, on the first day the troops were able to capture advanced positions, but failures began at the wire fences, the soldiers had to crawl up to the fortifications through the firing positions and suffered huge losses, however, the wiring was still cut, but they could not break into the trenches.

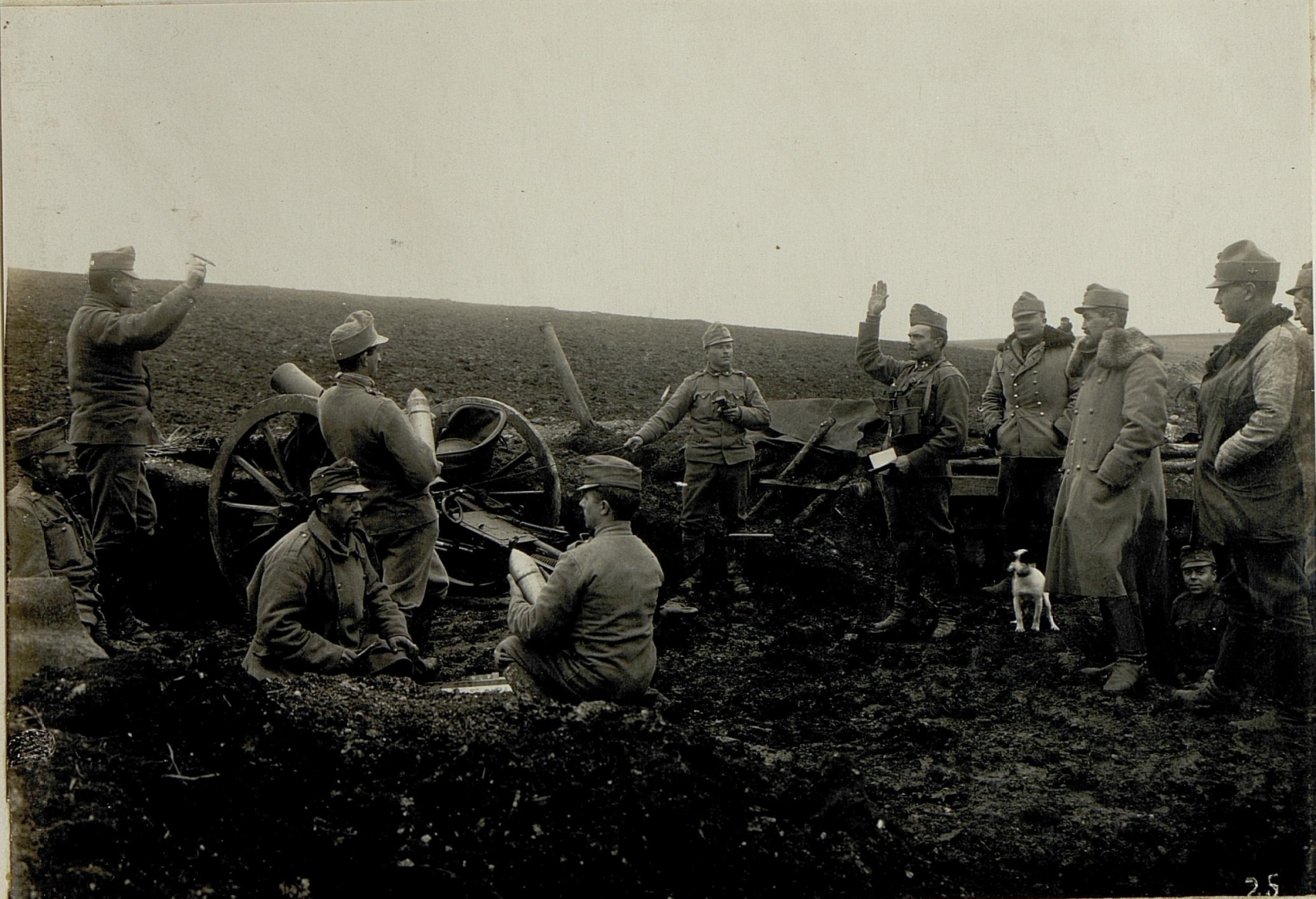
Artillery of the Central Powers on the Strypa

The 9th Army was active and conducted regular maneuvers in parts to give soldiers a rest, the Germans paid special attention to this front and immediately introduced reserves, but the Russians were able to advance near the city of Chernogorod. Due to heavy losses and insufficient information, the attacks soon stopped, now the Russians went on the defensive, which meant the collapse of all plans. On January 13, Alekseyev gave the order to freeze the fighting.

== Result ==
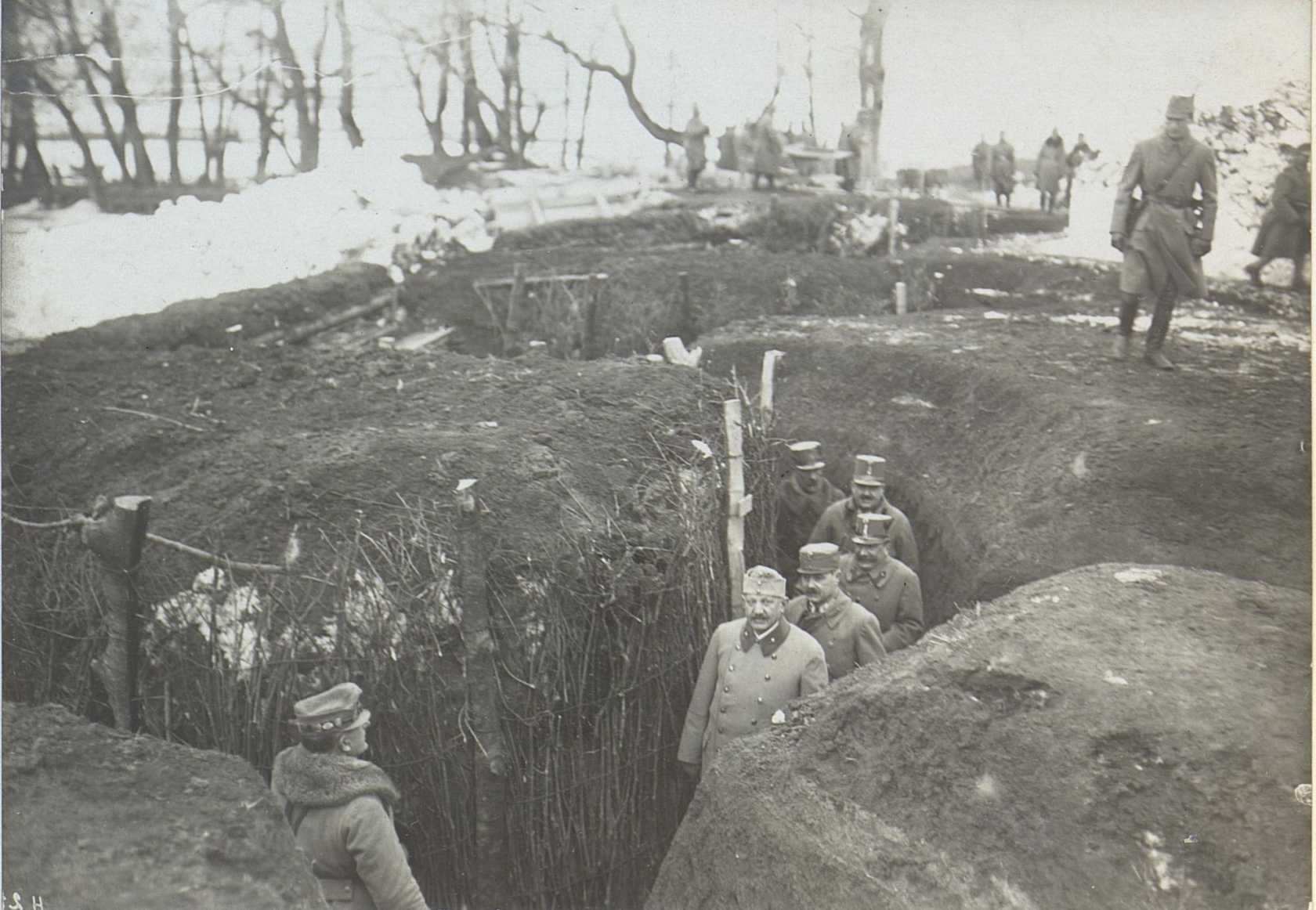
Samuel Baron von Hazai visit trench near Strypa in early 1916

The operation completely failed, none of the set goals were fulfilled. In various popular sources, the figure of losses appears up to 176,000, but these data are most likely overstated, the initial estimate of Soviet historians using Russian documents is 50,000 Later, the estimate was revised and the exact number of losses of the 7th and 9th Armies was named 46,803. Recent studies have also shown possible losses for Russians at 72,769 and 17,264 for Central Powers. Alexei Brusilov commented on the results of the battle as follows:

We were all terribly upset when the 7th Army launched an extremely unsuccessful offensive in December 1915.

However, this served as an important lesson, gradually the production of artillery supplies increased even more among the Russians, they became more careful about reconnaissance and equipped firing bridgeheads more.

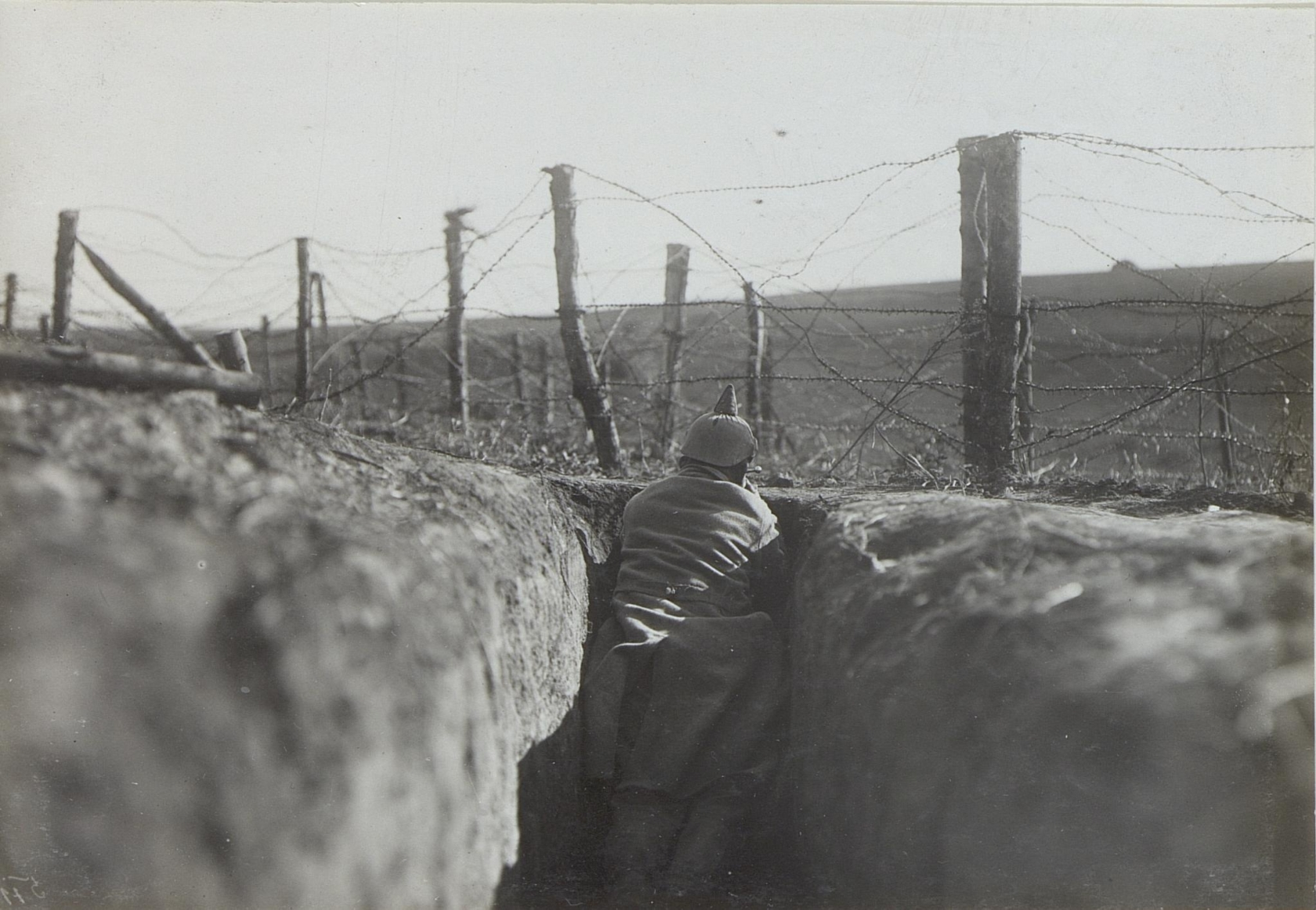
An Austrian soldier on the Strypa in 1917

Alexei Oleynikov also noted that during this period, only Russia, weakened by setbacks, decided to help Serbia.

== Aftermath ==
The mistakes of the battle were taken into account and by the end of the spring of 1916 they were eliminated, the nature of the use of artillery and the method of attack changed completely, all this allowed the southwestern front to inflict one of the most terrible defeats of the Central Powers.

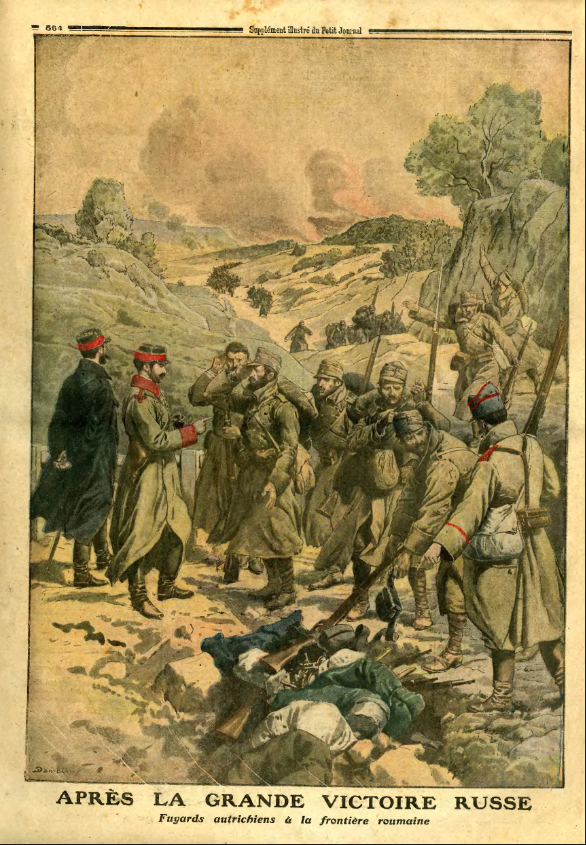
Austrians surrender to Russians

However, after the February revolution, due to the collapse of army discipline and an unsuccessful offensive in June, Austrian troops returned to the river and seized control of it.

== Reference and Notes ==
=== Bibliography ===
- Nelipovich, Sergei (2022). Русский фронт 1915: Потери сторон [The Russian Front 1915: Losses of the sides] (in Russian). Квадрига. ISBN 978-5-91791-447-3.
- Oleynikov, Alexei (2024). Великое отступление и стабилизация восточного фронта [The Great Retreat and stabilization of the Eastern Front]. Moscow: Вече. ISBN 978-5-4484-4482-1.
- Zayonchkovsky, Andrey (2002) [1929]. Первая Мировая Война [The First World War] (in Russian). St.Petersburg: Poligon. ISBN 5-89173-174-6.
- Klembovsky, V. (1920). Стратегический очерк войны 1914-1918: Позиционная война и прорыв австрийцев силами Юго-западного фронта [A strategic sketch of the war of 1914-1918: The Positional war and the breakthrough of the Austrians by the forces of the Southwestern Front] (PDF) (in Russian). Moscow.
- Borisyuk, Andrey (2024). Забытая война. Россия в 1914-1918 [The forgotten war. Russia in 1914-1918] (in Russian). Moscow: Вече. ISBN 978-5-4484-5078-5.
- Brusilov, Alexei (2023). Мои воспоминания. Из царской армии в Красную [: My memories. From the Tsarist Army to the Red Army] (in Russian). Moscow: Яуза. ISBN 978-5-04-176827-0.
- Kapustin, N. (1927). Оперативное искусство в позиционной войне [Operational art in positional warfare] (in Russian). Moscow: Государственное издательство.
