= Fablok 3DL =

Diesel mechanical locomotive

Type and origin
- Power type: Diesel-mechanical
- Builder: Fablok
- Build date: 1936–1938
- Total produced: 7
Specifications
- Configuration
  - AAR: B
  - UIC: B
- Gauge: 1,435 mm (4 ft 8 1/2 in)
- Wheel diameter: 850 mm (33.465 in)
- Wheelbase: 2,500 mm (98.425 in)
- Length: 6,920 mm (272.441 in)
- Width: 3,000 mm (118.110 in)
- Axle load: 12.5 t
- Loco weight: 25 t
- Fuel type: Diesel
- Prime mover: Deutz A4M220
- RPM
  - Maximum RPM: 1000 rpm
- Cylinders: 4
- Transmission: mechanical
- Couplers: Screw coupler
Performance figures
- Maximum speed: 21 km/h (13 mph)
- Power output: 74 kW (99.2 hp)
Career
- Delivered: 1936
- Disposition: All scrapped

Fablok 3DL is a Polish diesel-mechanical locomotive intended for shunting operations built by Fablok in Chrzanów between 1936 and 1938. The first unit was designated 627/1936, and the second one was designated 655/1936, whilst the later designation is unknown.

== Description ==
After the 2DL prototype was built, the 3DL locomotive was built in 1936 which was slightly better than the 2DL prototype, but had less power and speed, it was based on a locomotive documentation purchased by Deutz in 1932. 3DL had a 4-cylinder Deutz A4M220 diesel engine imported from Germany, 4 geared mechanical gearbox licensed by Deutz, pneumatic brakes and headlights powered by electricity. 3DL could reach the maximum engine power rated 100 horsepower, it also had a truss drive which could be installed in an additional transmission for 2 maximum speed ranges (21 or 48 km/h (13 or 30 mph)). 3DL locomotives were the successful example by Fablok.

3DL had a total length of 6,920 mm (22 ft 8 in), a cab length of 2,260 mm (7 ft 5 in), coupling rods length of 2,500 mm (8 ft 2 in), height to the buffer of 1,045 mm (3 ft 5.1 in), height to the locomotive nose hood of 2,400 mm (7 ft 10 in) and a total width of 3,000 mm (9 ft 10 in). The largest weight of the wagon train driven on a straight and horizontal tracks was 1,030 t (2,270,000 lb).

== Usage ==
3DL locomotives were intended for shunting duties at minor sidings on the industrial areas. The first locomotive (627/1936) was bought by a chemical plant along with the second example (655/1936), seven more locomotives were built until 1938 in which four went to the chemical plant and the three sold to the armament industry plants.
