= Polish State Railways in summer 1939 =

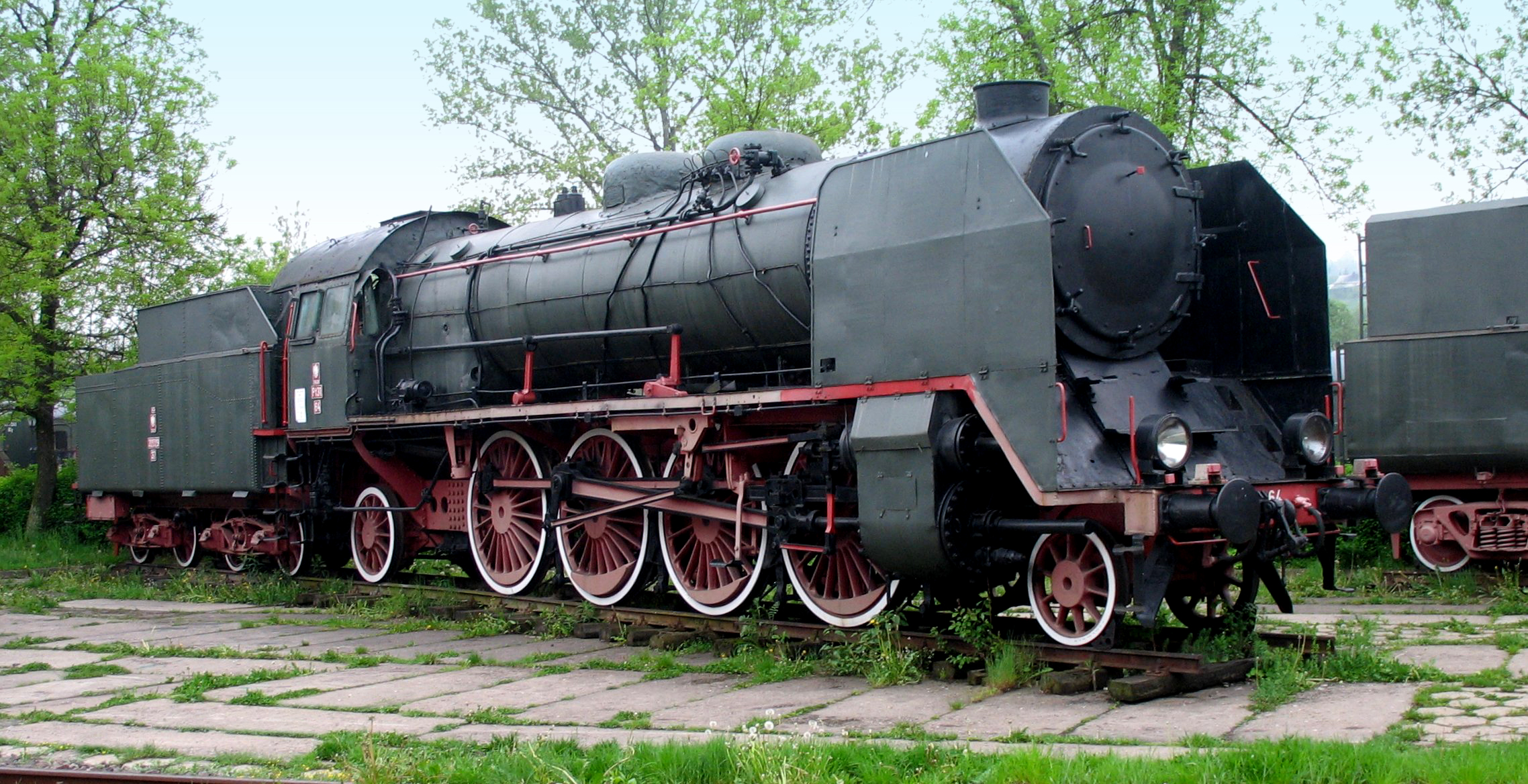
Poland's own locomotive Pt31-64 produced by H. Cegielski – Poznań in the interwar Second Polish Republic

In the summer of 1939, weeks ahead of the Nazi German and Soviet invasion of Poland the map of both Europe and Poland looked very different from today. The railway network of interwar Poland had little in common with the postwar reality of dramatically changing borders and political domination of the Soviet-style communism, as well as the pre-independence German, Austrian and Russian networks which the Second Polish Republic had partially inherited in 1918 after the end of World War I. The most important junctions in the Polish territory in summer of 1939 were:

- Lwów (Lviv), Tarnopol (Ternopil), Stanisławów (Ivano-Frankivsk), Stryj (Stryi), Kowel (Kovel), Chodorów (Khodoriv), Kołomyja (Kolomyia) and Sarny – all now in Ukraine,
- Łuniniec (Luninyets), Baranowicze (Baranavichy), Brześć nad Bugiem (Brest), Lida, Wołkowysk (Vawkavysk) and Mołodeczno (Maladzyechna) – all now in Belarus,
- Wilno (Vilnius), Landwarów (Lentvaris) – now in Lithuania,
- Cieszyn Zachodni (Český Těšín), Bogumin (Bohumín) – now in the Czech Republic.

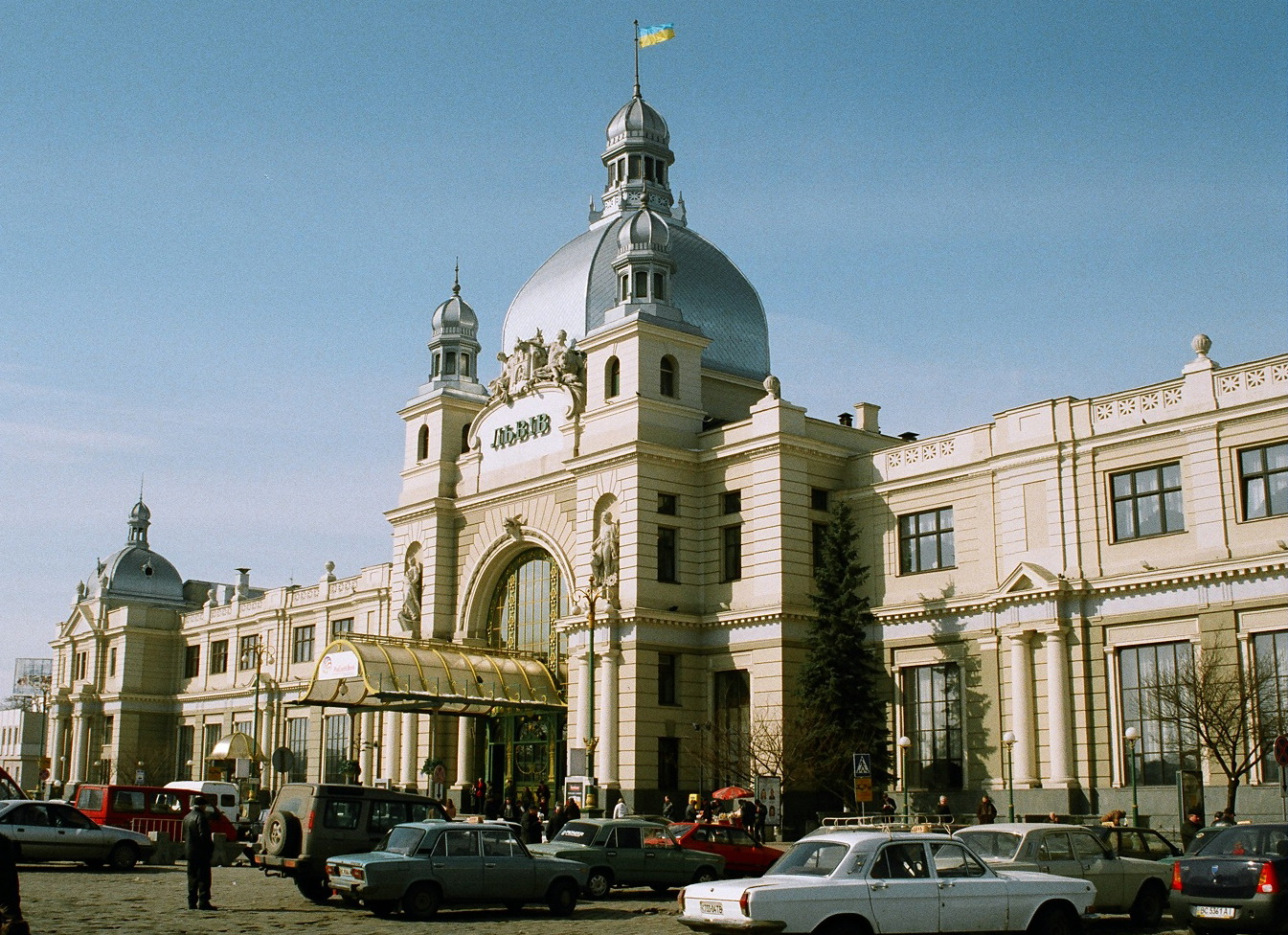
The Main Railway Terminal in today's Lviv, Ukraine, an Art Nouveau style construction designed in 1903 by Władysław Sadłowski for Austria's Lemberg, a city in 1939 placed in Poland as Lwów

Several junctions of today's Poland belonged in 1939 to Germany. Among them were such hubs as: Breslau (Wrocław), Stettin (Szczecin), Oppeln (Opole), Allenstein (Olsztyn), Liegnitz (Legnica), Köslin (Koszalin), Schneidemühl (Piła), Neustettin (Szczecinek), Lyck (Ełk). Gdańsk, another important junction, belonged to the Free City of Danzig.

Second Polish Republic 1922-1939

== Polish railway network in 1939 ==
The 1939 rail map of Poland was set by the nation's pre-1914 borders that were determined by the three empires that partitioned the Polish–Lithuanian Commonwealth late in the 18th century.

In the western part of Poland, in Poznań Voivodeship, Pomorze Voivodeship, and the Autonomous Silesian Voivodeship (former territories of the German Empire), the rail network was very dense. There were stations in all the towns and almost every city served as a junction.

Southern Poland (the former Austrian province of Galicia with Kraków Voivodeship, Lwów Voivodeship, Stanisławów Voivodeship, and Tarnopol Voivodeship) was less developed. The areas with a fairly dense rail network were only around Kraków and Lwów. In the very south, along the border with Slovakia, Romania, and Hungary, rail lines were virtually non-existent, although it is fair to say that lines would have been difficult to build in that mostly mountainous region anyway.

The worst situation was in Central and Eastern Poland – the territory of the former Russian Empire. These were the Voivodeships of Łódź, Kielce, Warsaw, Lublin, Białystok, Volhynian, Polesie, Nowogródek and Wilno. The rail network in some parts, especially in easternmost provinces (close to the Soviet border), was nonexistent. A better situation was around Warsaw and Łódź.

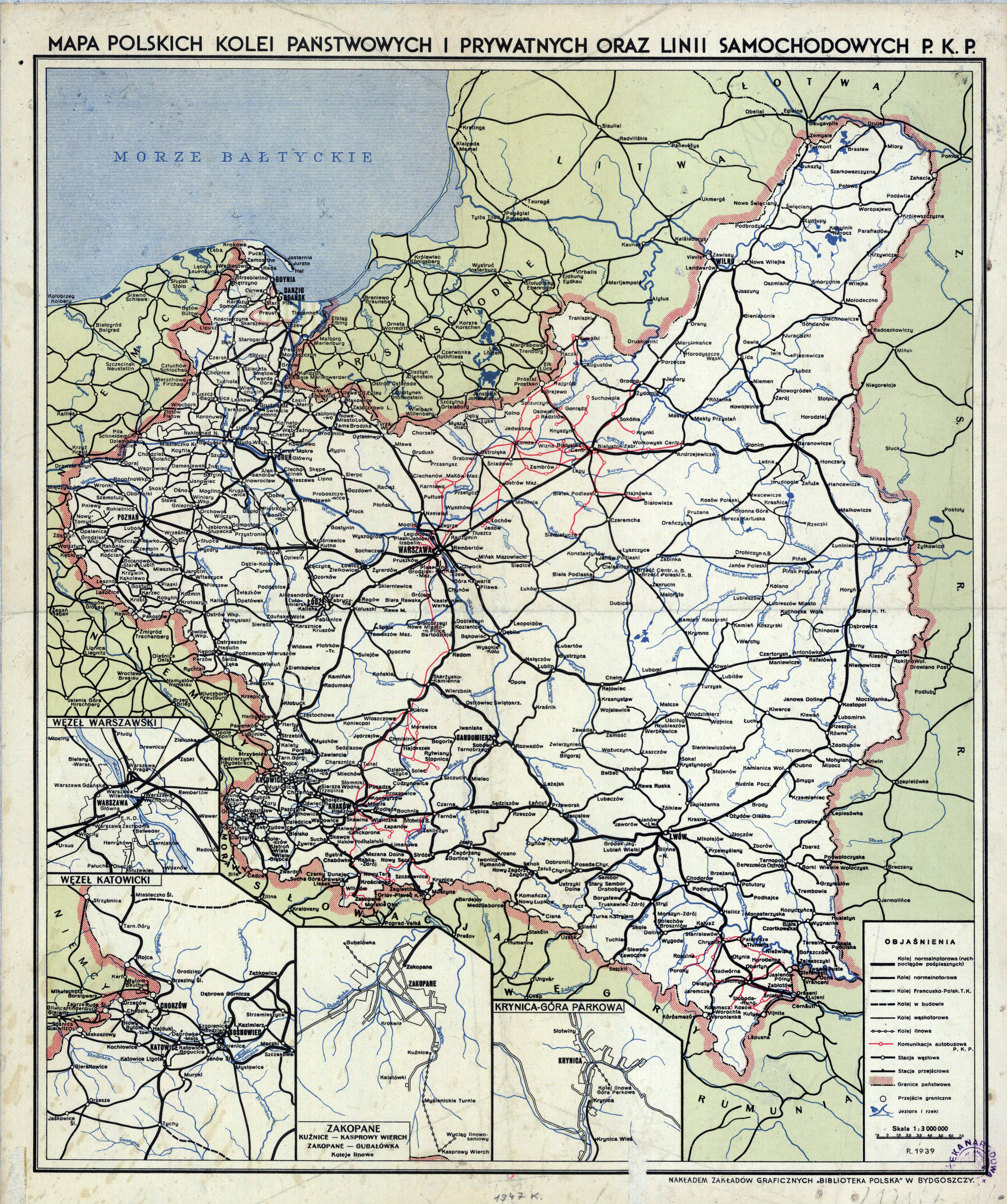
A map of the Polish railway network in 1939

Even though the Polish railway network in 1939 had deficiencies, the majority of important cities had convenient rail connections with each other. The major exception was the connection of Wilno to the seaport of Gdynia, some 500 km away. Trains running on this route had to cover a distance of about 900 km, because they had to go via Warsaw. Construction of a line that would shorten this distance was planned, but the start of World War II prevented any work. This line would have taken the route: Lapy (on the Warsaw-Białystok line) – Ostrołęka – Przasnysz – Mława (located on the Warsaw – Gdańsk/Gdynia line).

Another rail connection whose construction was stopped by the war was the line Dębica – Pilzno – Jasło. Works on it had already started in early 1939, but were never finished.

Electrification of long-distance lines was planned, but by 1939 only some of the suburban stretches around Warsaw were upgraded with the electric infrastructure.

== Polish national railway's structure in 1939 ==
In the summer of 1939, the PKP was divided into eight regions – Warsaw, Toruń, Poznań, Katowice, Cracow, Radom, Lwów and Wilno, with PKP's headquarters located in Warsaw. Also, for practical purposes, PKP was divided into five communications districts and every train in the timetable was numbered according to the district within which it operated. The districts were as follows:

– First – North-West, starting with the 278 km route Warsaw – Mława – Grudziądz – Laskowice Pomorskie (timetable route number 101),

– Second – West, starting with the 379 km route Warsaw – Kutno – Poznań – Zbąszyń (timetable route number 201),

– Third – South-West, starting with the 318 km route Warsaw – Koluszki – Ząbkowice – Katowice (timetable route number 301),

– Fourth – South-East, starting with the 491 km route Warsaw – Radom – Skarżysko – Rozwadów – Przemyśl – Lwów (timetable route number 401),

– Fifth – North-East, starting with the 571 km route Warsaw – Białystok – Wilno – Turmont (timetable route number 501).

Polish station on postcard, 1930s

== The summer 1939 timetable ==
"Urzędowy Rozkład Jazdy i Lotów Lato 1939" ("Official Train and Flight Timetable Summer 1939") was published in May 1939 and was valid from May 15, 1939, to October 7, 1939. What adds to this document's importance is the time it was published: just a few months before the Polish Second Republic (Druga Rzeczpospolita) ceased to exist. In the document we can find the following:

The following timetable is valid until October 7. On midnight of October 8, a new Winter timetable will be introduced, valid until May 18, 1940. All suggestions for necessary changes in the Winter timetable should be presented to the Polish National Railways Regional Directions not later than August 1.

Apart from the train timetable, the document also included the flight timetable of LOT Polish Airlines.

== Types of trains in 1939 ==
The following types of trains were run in Poland at that time: express, fast, and ordinary. The most interesting and impressive were the diesel express trains, or "Pociagi Motorowe-Ekspresowe – MtE" (some of them operated with the famous Luxtorpeda). The MtE units achieved speeds up to 110 km/h and connected Warsaw with the most important cities, as well as major tourist areas. The 179 km journey from Warszawa Wschodnia (Warsaw East) to Białystok Centralny was covered in 1 hour 56 minutes.

MtE trains ran from Warsaw to Łódź (a distance of 133 km in 1 hour 28 minutes), Kraków, Katowice (through either Częstochowa or Kielce), and Suwałki. They also operated on lines from Kraków to Katowice and the mountain resorts of Zakopane and Krynica. In southeastern Poland, MtE trains ran from Lwów to Zaleszczyki, Boryslaw, Tarnopol, and Kolomyja. In August 1939 a new MtE connected Warsaw with Poznań (due to the war the service lasted only few days).

Warsaw lacked an MtE connection with Lwów (the third largest city in 1939 Poland). This problem was solved by taking the morning express to Kraków where it split at Skarzysko, with one part becoming an express to Przeworsk. There passengers could also change to an international fast train travelling between Berlin and Bucharest.

Fast trains served long-distance lines, but they were not quite as fast as the MtE trains. The most interesting fast trains in the summer 1939 were:

- Wilno – Lwów (a journey of 720 km.) It crossed practically the whole Polish Eastern Borderlands, stopping at Lida, Baranowicze, Luniniec, Rowne, and Zdolbunow.
- Lwów – Kraków – Katowice – Poznań – Bydgoszcz – Gdynia – Hel (a journey of almost 1000 km). It traveled non-stop through the territory of the Free City of Danzig.

The last train category in Poland were ordinary trains. They usually served short-distance lines, but in some cases covered impressive distances, especially in the Polish Eastern Borderlands.

== International trains ==
In 1939, trains tended to run over longer distances than today. The Nord Express Warsaw – Berlin – Paris – Calais ran daily and it was the only train in Poland of the L (Luxurious) standard. This train consisted only of coaches owned by the Compagnie Internationale des Wagons-Lits. There also was another train to the English Channel coast: from Warsaw, Lwów, Kraków and Katowice to Ostend. Warsaw was also connected with the capital of France by a Warsaw – Łódź – Paris train. Another train to France ran from Warsaw to Strasbourg, with cars to Geneva and Ventimiglia.

As for the south of Europe, trains ran from Warsaw to Rome, and in the summer also to three cities in Yugoslavia: Split, Sušak and Belgrade. A train from Berlin to Istanbul on the Berlin–Baghdad railway crossed Polish territory. Warsaw, Cracow and Lwów had trains to Vienna.

Warsaw was connected with Prague, Bratislava and Žilina. Lwów and Gdynia were also connected with Prague. Budapest had train connections with Warsaw, Cracow and Lwów (the train from Cracow to Budapest had a coach from Krynica to Budapest attached).

Romania was served twice daily by Warsaw–Lwów–Bucharest trains (in the summer an additional train reached the Romanian seaport of Constanţa). Poland was also crossed by an international train Berlin – Breslau – Katowice – Kraków – Lwów – Sniatyn – Bucharest (with a direct car Katowice – Constanţa). Other transit trains ran between Berlin and East Prussia, Danzig, Riga and Daugavpils.

Twice a day a train from Wilno reached Kaunas. One of them had a direct Warsaw-Kaunas coach.

Passenger rail connections between the Soviet Union and Western Europe required a change of trains due to the difference in gauge. If one traveled towards Moscow, it was necessary to change at the Soviet border station Niegoreloje. Travelling from Moscow, the change took place at the Polish station Stolpce.

Altogether there were 48 rail border crossings in operation in the summer of 1939.

== Curiosities ==
- Rail lines of Wolne Miasto Gdańsk (Free City of Danzig) were controlled by the Toruń region of the Polish State Railways, therefore were included in the Polish timetable.
- In the summer of 1939, three pairs of German transit trains crossed the Polish Corridor daily en route to East Prussia: two between Berlin and Eydtkau (now Chernyshevskoye) and one between Berlin and Tilsit (now Sovetsk). They travelled through the Polish territory between Chojnice and Tczew-Liessau (Lisewo), the distance of 97 km.
- Apart from long-distance fast trains, there were also ordinary and accelerated trains, that ran on very long routes in interwar Poland. The best example is the train Wejherowo – Toruń – Kutno – Łódź Kaliska – Rozwadów – Lwów, which crossed virtually the whole Poland, from southeast to the coast (930 km). Other interesting examples are: Warszawa Wilenska – Brzesc n/B Centralny – Pinsk – Mikaszewicze (490 km), Warszawa Wilenska – Siedlce – Wolkowysk – Lida – Molodeczno (530 km), Warszawa Glowna – Lublin – Kowel – Zdolbunow (480 km), Warsaw Gdanska – Lublin – Rejowiec – Zawada – Rawa Ruska – Lwów (438 km).

== See also ==
- Timetable of Polish Railways and LOT Polish Airlines in 1947(in English and French also), online
- Timetable of Polish Railways – oriented for Greater Poland from 17 may 1938 as appendix to Kurier Poznański
