= David Yeshayahu Silberbusch =

Galician Jewish writer (1854–1936)

- דוד ישעיהו זילברבוש
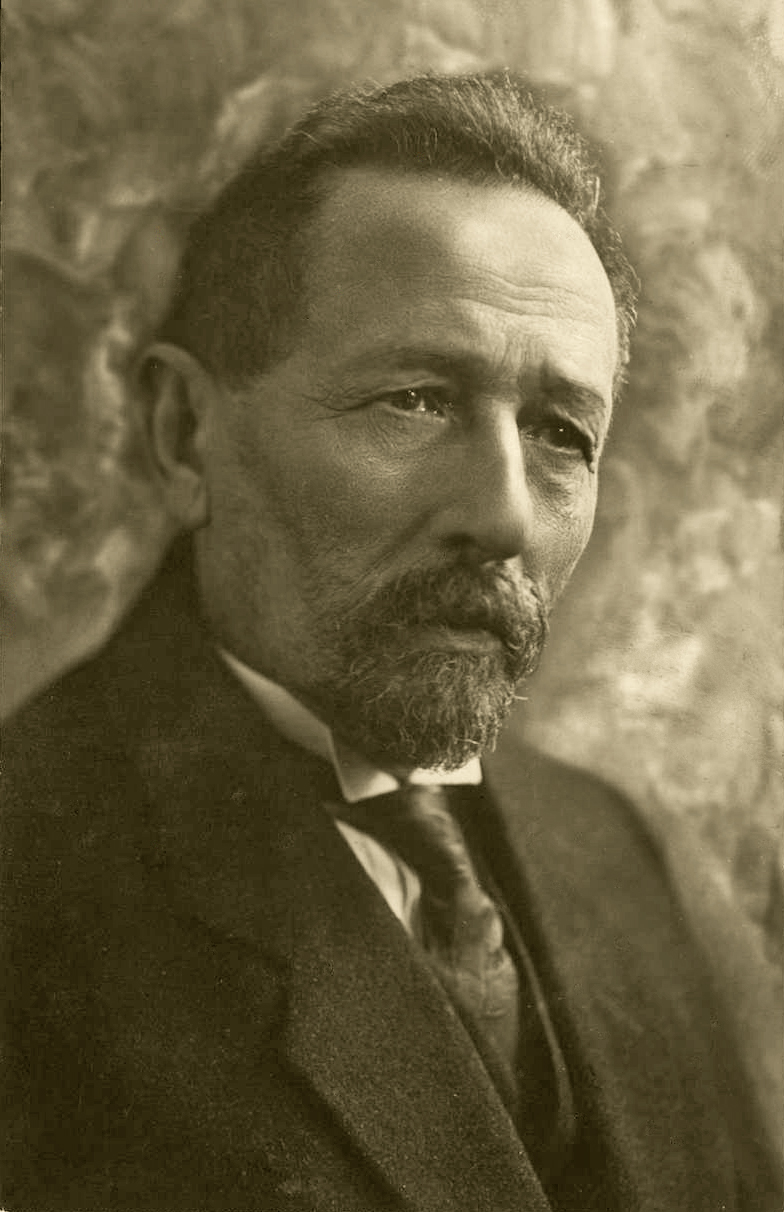
- Born: 22 November 1854; Zaleshtshik, Eastern Galicia, Austria-Hungary
- Died: 1 March 1936 (aged 81); Tel Aviv-Yafo, Mandatory Palestine
- Resting place: Trumpeldor Cemetery
- Writing career
- Pen name: Ish Yehudi (איש יהודי)

David Yeshayahu Silberbusch (Yiddish: דוד ישעיהו זילבּערבּוש, Hebrew: דוד ישעיהו זִילבֶּרבּוּש, romanized: David Yeshayahu Zilberbush; 22 November 1854 – 1 March 1936) was a Galician Hebrew and Yiddish writer and journalist.

== Biography ==
David Yeshayahu Silberbusch was born in Zaleshtshik, Eastern Galicia, where he received a traditional Jewish education. He married the daughter of a wealthy Jewish landowner at the age of twenty but became a widower within six months. he married a second time in Kolomaye while living as a guest of his in-laws and studying Hebrew and German literature. He published his first work in Peretz Smolenskin's journal Ha-Mabit in 1878.

Silberbusch later lived in Botoșani, Lemberg, and Vienna, settling in Palestine in 1934. He died there three years later.
