= Jan Sehn =

Polish lawyer and judge (1909–1965)

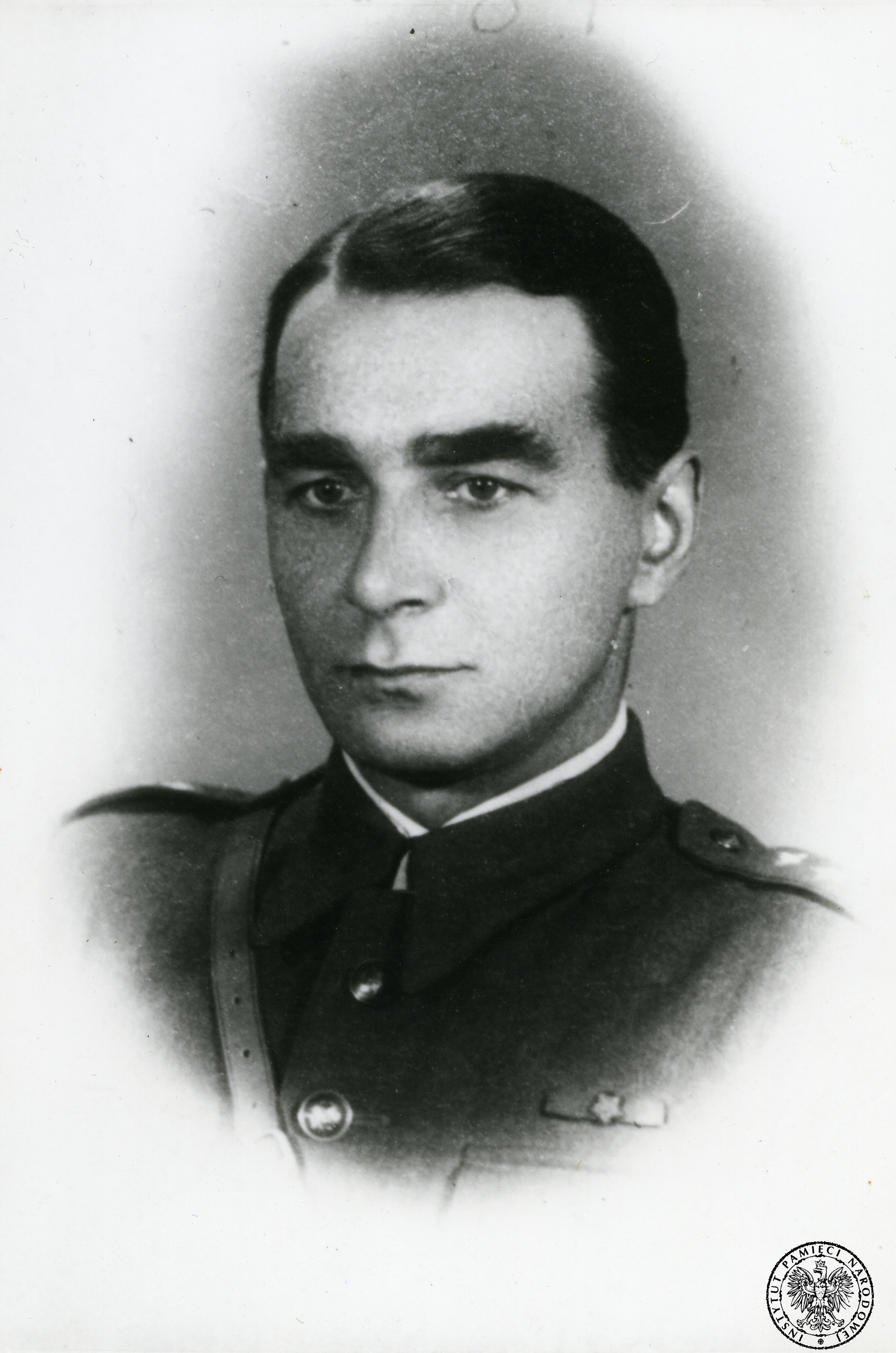
Jan Sehn

Jan Sehn (22 April 1909 – 12 December 1965) was a Polish lawyer, 1945 to 1947 investigating magistrate, and professor at Jagiellonian University since 1961. He was a member of the Chief Commission for the Prosecution of Crimes against the Polish Nation, and Chairman of the Kraków District Commission until 1953. In 1945 and 1946, he led the investigations on the site of the Nazi concentration camp Auschwitz-Birkenau. As an investigative judge, he investigated the commandants of the camps of Płaszów - Amon Göth, and Auschwitz – Rudolf Höß and Josef Bühler, the head of the so-called General Government. From 1949 he was director of the Institute of Forensic Research in Kraków. Sehn died suddenly on 12 December 1965 in Frankfurt.

In 1966 the Institute of Forensic Research in Kraków was named after him.

He was the cousin of Wanda Szczerba (1910–1998), who was married to engineer and technical director of Fablok Klemens Stefan Sielecki (1903–1980).

== Awards ==
- The Złoty Krzyż Zasługi (The Gold Cross of Merit) in 1948.
- The Krzyż Kawalerski Orderu Odrodzenia Polski (Knights Cross of the Order of Restoration of Poland) in 1954.
- Medal 10-lecia Polski Ludowej (Medal of the 10th Anniversary of People's Poland in 1955.

== Selected publications ==
- Wspomnienia Rudolfa Hoessa komendanta obozu oświęcimskiego, ed. Jan Sehn, Warsaw, 1960.
- Konzentrationslager Oswiecim-Brzezinka (Auschwitz-Birkenau), Warsaw, 1957.
