= Klemens Stefan Sielecki =

Polish engineer

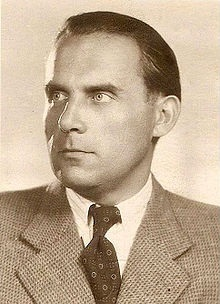
- Klemens Stefan Sielecki (1940's)
- Born: December 8, 1903; Stanisławów, Austria-Hungary (now Ivano-Frankivsk, Ukraine)
- Died: July 14, 1980 (aged 76); Kamień Pomorski, Poland
- Education: Lwów Polytechnic
- Occupation: Engineer
- Known for: Technical director of the first Polish Locomotive Factory Fablok
- Notable work: Development of the Luxtorpeda
- Spouse: Wanda Maria née Szczerba
- Children: Krystyna Elżbieta, Renata Beata, Leszek Michael
- Parent(s): Sofroniusz Skrebeciowicz de Sielecki (father), Leontyna Lintner (mother)
- Honors: Medal of the 10th Anniversary of People's Poland (1955), Knight's Cross of the Order of Polonia Restituta (1967)

Klemens Stefan Sielecki (December 8, 1903 in Stanisławów, Austria-Hungary – July 14, 1980 in Kamień Pomorski, Poland) was a Polish engineer and technical director of the first Polish Locomotive Factory Fablok in Chrzanów in the post-war years until 1964.

== Biography ==
His father Sofroniusz Skrebeciowicz de Sielecki (1862–1908) was civil servant at the Imperial Royal Austrian State Railways, stationed in various places throughout Galicia. His mother Leontyna née Lintner (1877–1913). He had one younger sister, Czesława (1907–1993). Both became orphans at an early age and were raised by their maternal aunt Jozéfina and her husband Adolf Skrzyszewski, who was also employed at the state railway. The Skrebeciowicz de Sielecki family with the Sas coat of arms was nobility (in Polish called szlachta), originally from Sielec, Drohobych Raion.

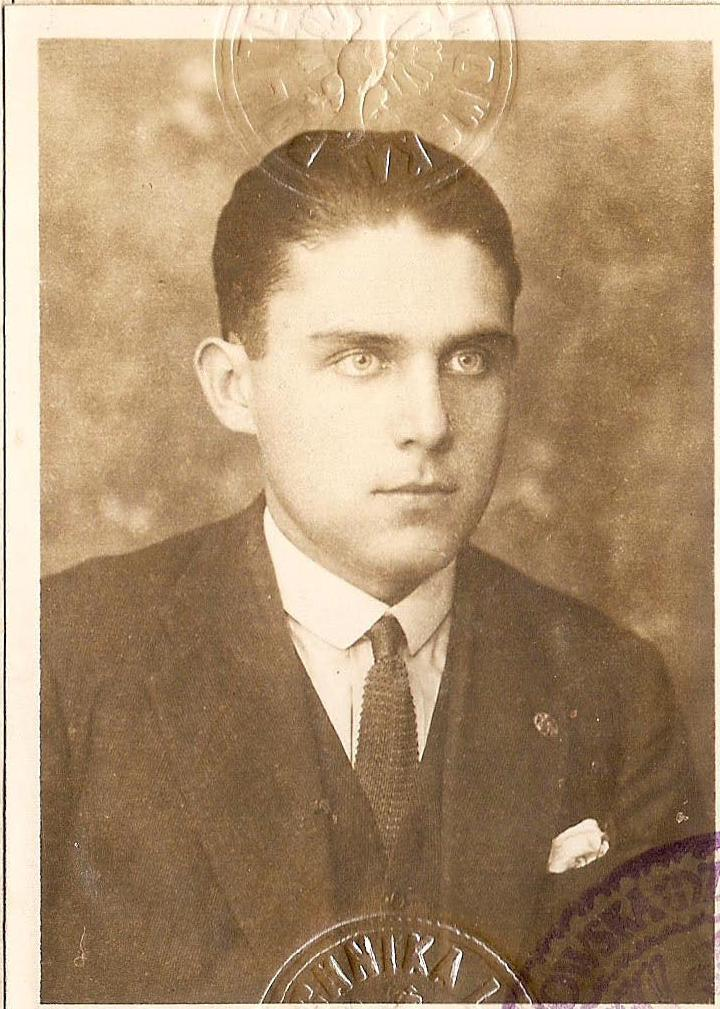
Klemens Stefan Sielecki at the age of 22 during his studies at Lwów Polytechnic (1925)

Klemens Sielecki went to primary school in Chernivtsi and the Imperial and Royal Gymnasium V in Kraków and received his matriculation in Stanisławów in 1921. He enrolled in the Lwów Polytechnic on November 24, 1921, where he studied engineering and railroading and graduated on December 14, 1929 with a master's degree. During his studies in 1925, after three months of interning he received his steam engine-driving license. In the year 1925-26 he did his internships in the workshops and offices of the state railway of Lwów and Stanisławów and familiarised himself with the production of steam locomotives of Fablok in Chrzanów and the Steam Locomotive Factory in Warsaw (Fabryka Parowozow Warszawa). After earning his absolutorium in 1927, he worked in the locomotive depot in Lwów in the gauging department and later as a designer in the mechanical factory in Lwów "L. Zieleniewski-Fitzner-Gamper SA". From October 1, 1928 until April 30, 1930 he worked as a young assistant at the chair of engineering (I Katedry Budowy Maszyn) under professor Wilhelm Mozer and at the same time as assistant at the university don for organisation and management of industries at the Lwów Polytechnic.

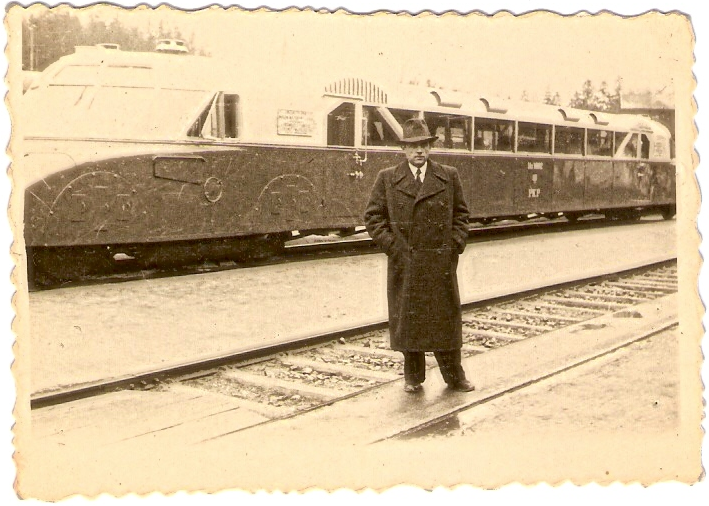
Sielecki in front of the Luxtorpeda at Zakopane train station (1935)

On May 1, 1930 he moved to Chrzanów, where he started work in the design office of Fablok in charge of developing new types of locomotives for the then ministry of communication (which later became the ministry of transport) and the Bulgarian State Railways. In 1935 he was highly involved in the development of the construction of the diesel hydraulic railway car called "Luxtorpeda", which was a technical innovation in its time. Also in 1935 he was nominated as deputy head of the technical department and starting in March 1939 as head. Five Luxtorpedas were constructed under his leadership, which were able to reach a speed of 115 km/h. He was involved with the construction, production and test-runs of locomotives in particular those destined for export to Bulgaria, Morocco, Lithuania and Soviet Union. Due to his knowledge of foreign languages he was repeatedly sent abroad for business purposes pertaining technical aspects and co-operation.

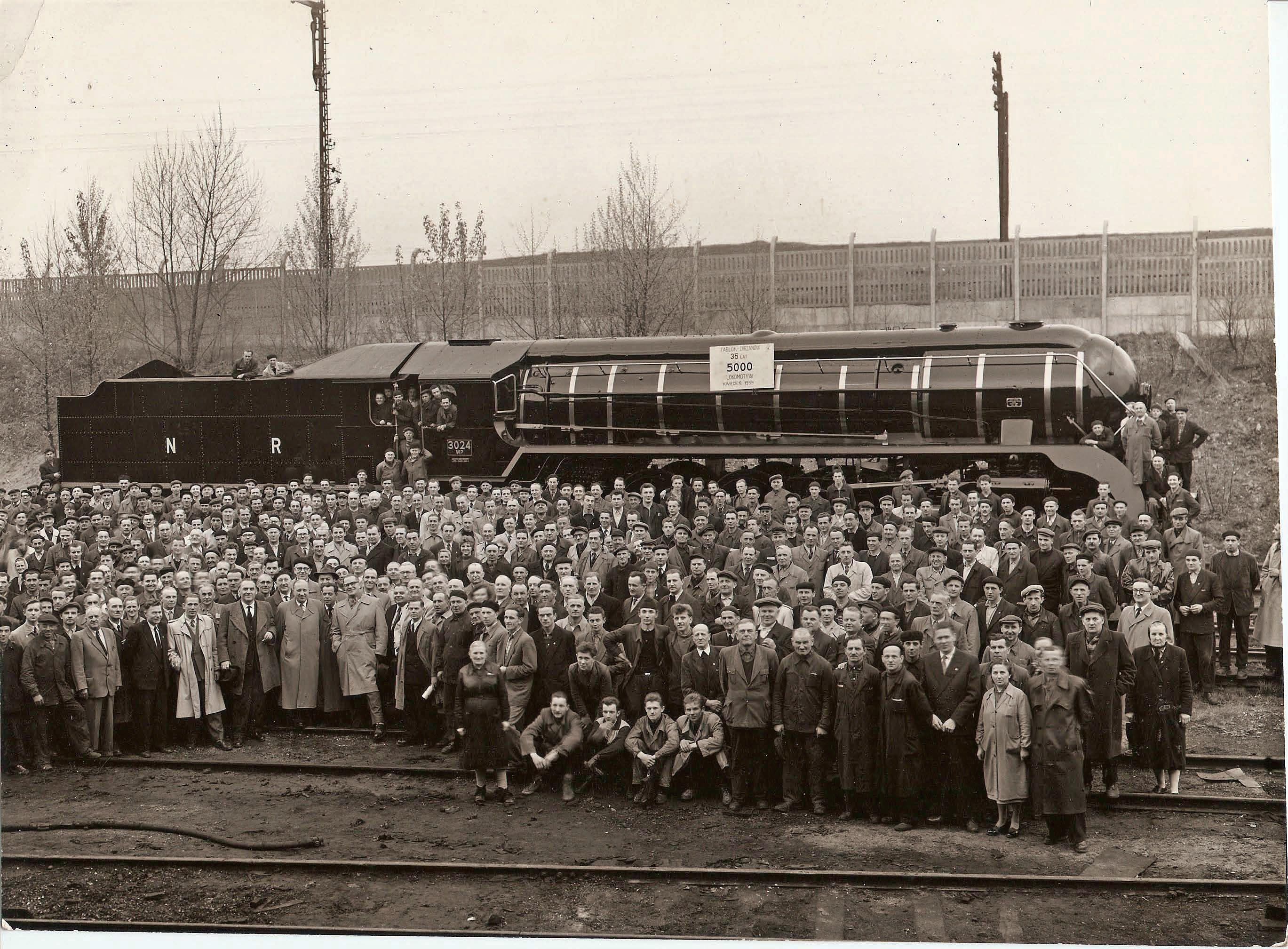
Group photo of Fablok employees celebrating the production of the 5,000th locomotive WP destined for India, in 1959. Sielecki is standing 6th from left front row.

During the Nazi occupation of Poland, Fablok was incorporated into Henschel & Son under the name Oberschlesische Lokomotivwerke Krenau. Sielecki worked as a technologist. In this time, with the consent of the general director Guido Sanchez de la Cerda, he was involved in protecting his Jewish co-workers from Nazi persecution. Together with his colleagues from the technical bureau he started hiding the technical documentation for steam, industrial diesel and electrical locomotives and moved them completely out of the plant in January 1945, since the Nazis wanted them destroyed. After Poland was liberated, this documentation proved vital for the re-construction efforts of the national railway industry, especially the diesel and electrical locomotives. This allowed Fablok to restart the production of these types.

In the post-war years, he was technical director until 1964. Under his leadership, the production was re-established for multiple types of locomotives, 12 of that type were destined for export. From 1945-61 he accompanied delegations of the ministry heavy industry and foreign trade of on various occasions to trips abroad. From 1965, he was technical advisor to the board until his retirement on March 31, 1971. In the 1960s and 70's, he also lectured at the Cracow University of Technology and technical school in Chrzanów.

He died of a sudden heart failure while vacationing with his family. He was laid to rest in the family tomb in Rakowicki Cemetery in Kraków.

== Works ==
He published various essays on technological subjects, his first one appeared 1932 in the Fablok publication for the 500th locomotive produced, as well as six folios for the 50-year anniversary of Fablok 1924–1974. He translated various technical literature and books from German into Polish. He was also very active in the Kraków chapter of the Polish Federation of Engineering Associations (NOT). He was co-founder 1937 in Fablok of the Polish Society of Mechanical Engineers and Technicians (SIMP) and was head of the Fablok chapter for many years. Together with engineer Zdzisław Wład he developed a patent for a high power electric/hydraulic waterbrake for locomotives in the late 1950s.

== Honours ==
Although he refused to join the Polish United Workers' Party (PZPR) throughout his life, he nevertheless was decorated for outstanding professional and social work in 1955 with the Medal of the 10th Anniversary of People's Poland and in 1967 with the Knight's Cross (Krzyż Kawalerski) of the Order of Polonia Restituta.

== Family ==
He married Wanda Maria née Szczerba (November 21, 1910 in Brzozów – June 12, 1998 in Kraków) in 1935 in the Church of St. Anne, Kraków. For this marriage he converted from Greek to Roman Catholicism. Together they had three children: Krystyna Elżbieta (October 14, 1936 in Kraków – March 2, 2003 ibid.) who became a doctor of dermatology; Renata Beata (born August 27, 1942 in Kraków) and Leszek Michael (born October 12, 1944 in Chrzanów), who also studied engineering at the technical universities in Kraków and Vienna to later work for Simmering-Graz-Pauker in Vienna and New Delhi, and MAN Ferrostaal in New Delhi, Bangkok and Kuala Lumpur. All married and have children themselves.

The cousin of his wife Wanda was the investigation judge against Nazi crimes Professor Jan Sehn, who was on very friendly terms with the Sielecki family.

== Literature ==
- Krasnowolskiego, Bogusław, ed. (2004), Fablok w Chrzanowie. Monografia, Warsaw: Studio Reklamy ateFOKA, ISBN 83-918844-8-1
