= Zalishchyky Park =

Park in Ternopil Oblast, Ukraine

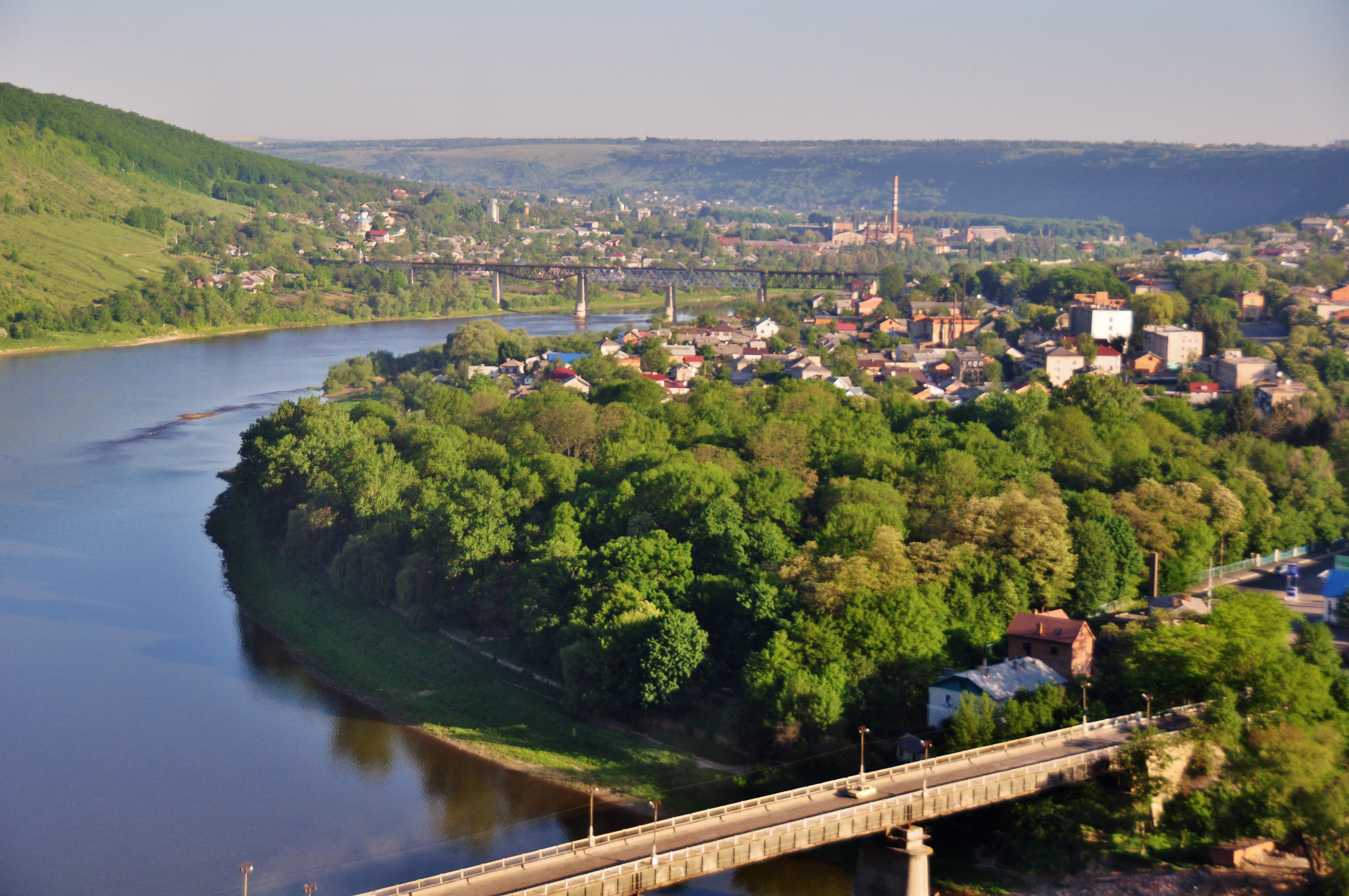
- The park as seen from a cliff overlooking the Dniester
- Interactive map of Zalishchyky Park
- Type: Urban park
- Location: Zalishchyky; Ternopil; Ukraine
- Coordinates: 48°38′8″N 25°43′58″E
- Area: 5 hectares (0.050 km^{2})
- Created: 19th century 1972 (status as 'park' officialized)
- Operator: Ternopil Oblast Council

Zalishchyky Park (Ukrainian: Заліщицький парк, romanized: Zalishchytsʹkyy park) or Lordly Park (Ukrainian: Панський парк, romanized: Pansʹkyy park) officially called Lower Park (Ukrainian: Нижній парк, romanized: Nyzhniy park) is an urban park/natural monument or zakaznik (Ukrainian: заказни́к/зака́зник, romanized: zakaznýk/zakáznyk, lit. 'reserve') located on a natural terrace on the left bank of the Dniester River in southern Zalishchyky, in the Ternopil Oblast of western Ukraine. The park is home to more than 45 unique and exotic species of fauna, including the Maidenhair tree, red oak, European horse-chesnut, Amur cork tree, and Tartarian honeysuckle.

Established in the late 19th century, the park remains one of the oldest operational parks in the Ternopil Oblast. The park has been maintained by Ukraine's Nature Preservation Fund since 1972.

Together with the Zalishchyky Central Park, (Ukrainian: Дністровський каньйон, romanized: Dnistrovsʹkyy kanʹyon, lit. 'Dneister Canyon') the park is part of the Dniester Canyon National nature park.
