= Fablok G1C =

First Polish diesel locomotive

Type and origin
- Power type: Diesel-electric
- Builder: Fablok
- Serial number: 406/1931
- Build date: 1931
- Total produced: 1
Specifications
- Configuration
  - Whyte: 4wDE
  - AAR: B
  - UIC: Bo
- Gauge: 1,435 mm (4 ft 8 1/2 in)
- Wheel diameter: 1,000 mm (39.370 in)
- Wheelbase: 2,000 mm (78.740 in)
- Length: 5,500 mm (216.535 in)
- Width: 2,360 mm (92.913 in)
- Height: 4,380 mm (172.441 in)
- Axle load: 6 t
- Loco weight: 12.1 t
- Fuel type: Diesel
- Prime mover: Warchalowski-Diesel
- Cylinders: 2
- Transmission: Electric
- Couplers: Screw coupler
Performance figures
- Maximum speed: 20 km/h (12 mph)
- Power output: 2 x 35 kW (2 x 46.9 hp)
Career
- Delivered: 1931
- Disposition: 1 dismantled into a flatcar

Fablok G1C is the first diesel locomotive built in Poland (especially in Second Polish Republic) by Fablok in Chrzanów. It was built in 1931 and was intended for works transportation.
