= Fablok 2DL =

Polish shunting diesel locomotive

Type and origin
- Power type: Diesel-mechanical
- Builder: Fablok
- Build date: 1935
- Total produced: 1
Specifications
- Configuration
  - AAR: B
  - UIC: B
- Gauge: 1,435 mm (4 ft 8 1/2 in)
- Wheel diameter: 850 mm (33.465 in)
- Wheelbase: 3,000 mm (118.110 in)
- Length: 8,500 mm (334.646 in)
- Width: 2,960 mm (116.535 in)
- Axle load: 14.4 t
- Loco weight: 28.8 t
- Fuel type: Diesel
- Prime mover: Deutz A6M220
- Cylinders: 6
- Loco brake: Knorr
- Couplers: Screw coupler
Performance figures
- Maximum speed: 48 km/h (30 mph)
- Power output: 118 kW (158 hp)
Career
- Operators: Gostyń District Railway
- Delivered: 1935

Fablok 2DL was a Polish diesel-mechanical locomotive ordered by the Gostyń District Railway. It is the largest and most powerful diesel locomotive built by Fablok in Chrzanów from the 1930s.

== Description ==
2DL is fitted with a 4-geared mechanical transmission with coupling rods and a 6-cylinder Deutz A6M220 diesel engine, capable of reaching speed of 48 km/h (30 mph) and reaching the maximum engine power up to 160 horsepower. Its total length is 8,500 mm (330 in), the frame length is 7,200 mm (280 in), the buffer length is 650 mm (26 in), the coupling rods length is 4,050 mm (159 in), height to the buffer is 1,050 mm (41 in) and the height to the locomotive nose hood is 2,600 mm (100 in). Its axle load contains 14.4 tons, and the weight of the locomotive itself contains 28.8 tons (2 times the axle load weight).

== Usage ==
2DL was ordered by the Gostyń District Railway in 1934 with a deadline, it was then completed in May 1935 with most of its components purchased by Deutz, the example was proven successful, but no further orders followed. 2DL was assigned to operate shunting duties on the railway yard in Gostyń, it mostly followed the task of shunting wagons around the railway sidings intended for only carrying freight from the narrow gauge railway, shunting them from the loading deck and forming them into a train.
