= Vasyl Lopukh =

Ukrainian public figure and economist (born 1956)

- Василь Лопух
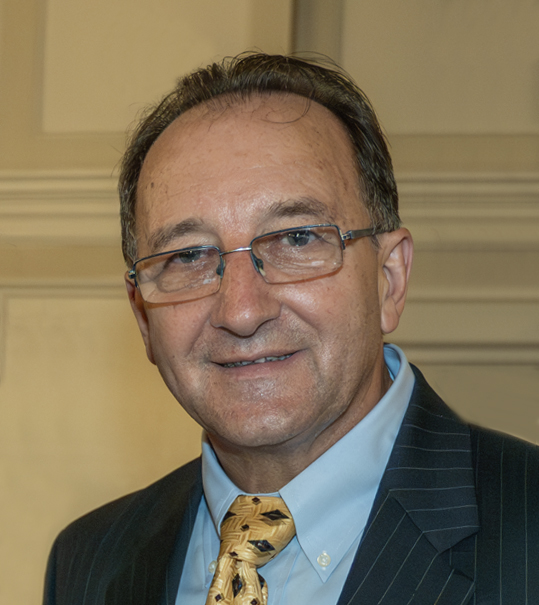
- Born: Vasyl Stepanovych Lopukh; 2 March 1956 (age 70); Zalishchyky, Ternopil Oblast
- Education: Ternopil Pedagogical Institute
- Occupations: Public figure, economist

Vasyl Stepanovych Lopukh (Ukrainian: Василь Степанович Лопух; born 2 March 1956) is a Ukrainian public figure and economist. In 1990 he became a Candidate of Economic Sciences, and from 2008 he is a full member and corresponding member of the Shevchenko Scientific Society.

== Biography ==
Vasyl Lopukh was born on 2 March 1956 in Zalishchyky, Ternopil Oblast.

Until 1973, he studied at the Osyp Makovei Secondary School in Zalishchyky. In 1981, he graduated from the Faculty of Engineering and Pedagogy of the Ternopil Pedagogical Institute. In 1970–1974 he was a soloist of the song and dance ensemble "Dnister" at the Zalishchyky House of Culture. In 1981, he started working at Ternopil Pedagogical Institute as a lecturer, associate professor of economic theory, and other positions. In 1996, he co-initiated the founding and edited the first issue of the History Faculty's journal "Storinky litopysu". In 1991, he was Deputy Chairman for Economic Affairs of the Ternopil City Council.

From 1998 he has been in the United States. In 2000, he worked in New York as director of administration, and from 2006 he has been a member of the board and chairman of the press committee of the Shevchenko Scientific Society in the United States. In 2001, he became chairman of the Ukrainian American Association. In 2010, he co-founded the Center for Demographic and Socio-Economic Studies of Ukrainians at the Shevchenko Scientific Society in the United States. He is one of the editors of Nash Holos magazine. He was engaged in digitizing photographs from the archive of the Ukrainian Sich Riflemen.

Research interests: demographic processes in the Ukrainian immigrant community in the United States. He has more than 30 author and co-author scientific publications; journalistic articles in periodicals. He also published the textbook "Osnovy pidpryiemnytskoi diialnosti" in 1996.

He is a member of the editorial boards of the Biuleten NTSh-Ameryka, Nash Holos magazine, and the Encyclopedia of Ukrainian Diaspora (2009, vol. 1, book 1, New York; Chicago).
