= Saint Stanislaus Church, Zalishchyky =

Church in Zalishchyky, Ukraine

Saint Stanislaus Church
- Костел Святого Станіслава
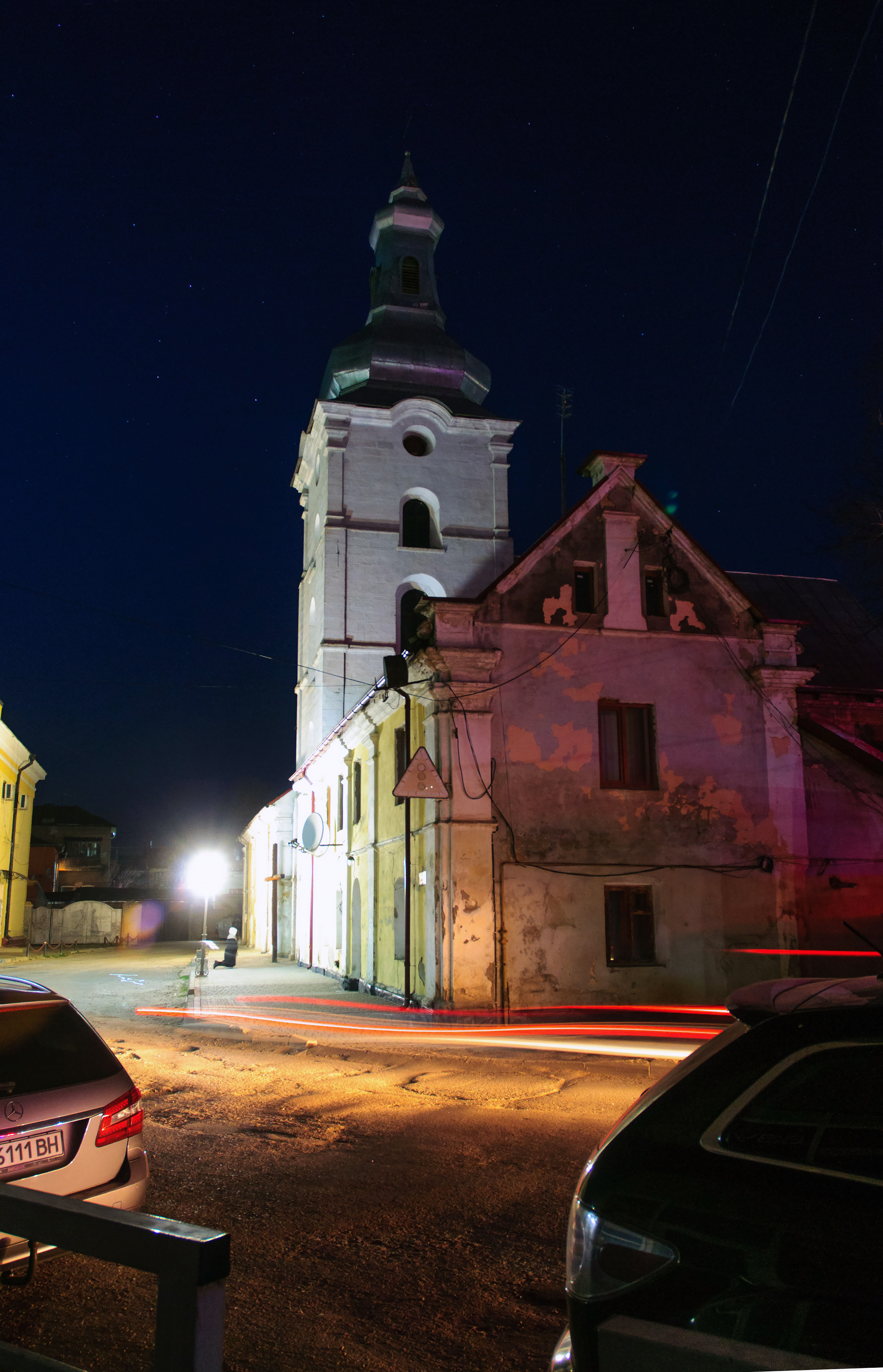

- Location within Ternopil Oblast

Location
- Location: Zalishchyky
- Interactive map of Saint Stanislaus Church
- Coordinates: 48°38′28.44″N 25°44′00″E

Saint Stanislaus Church (Ukrainian: Костел Святого Станіслава) is a Roman Catholic parish church in Zalishchyky, Ternopil Oblast. An architectural monument of local importance.

== History ==
In 1763, the construction of the Baroque church was financed by Stanisław Poniatowski.

The church was closed after the end of World War II. However, in the 1990s, it was returned to the religious community and subsequently restored. Currently, the parish is under the spiritual care of the Mikhailite priests.

== Architecture ==
The building has a rectangular plan and is distinguished by its monumental facade, accentuated by a high tower topped with a Baroque dome (helmet). On both sides of the tower are two-story complexes, including the parish house and the organist's house. In the interior decoration of the church, above the doorway to the sacristy, there is a cartouche with a Ciołek Poniatowski coat of arms.

== Priests ==
- Antoni Palkiewicz (until 1877)
- Kawiecki
- Michał Piotrowski
- Antoni Poznański
- Józef Adamski
- Andrzej Urbański

== Bibliography ==
- "Zaleszczyki 1.) miasto powiatowe". Geographical Dictionary of the Kingdom of Poland (in Polish). 14. Warszawa: Kasa im. Józefa Mianowskiego. 1895. p. 345—347.
