= Zalishchyky =

City in Ternopil Oblast, Ukraine

Zalishchyky Залiщики
- City
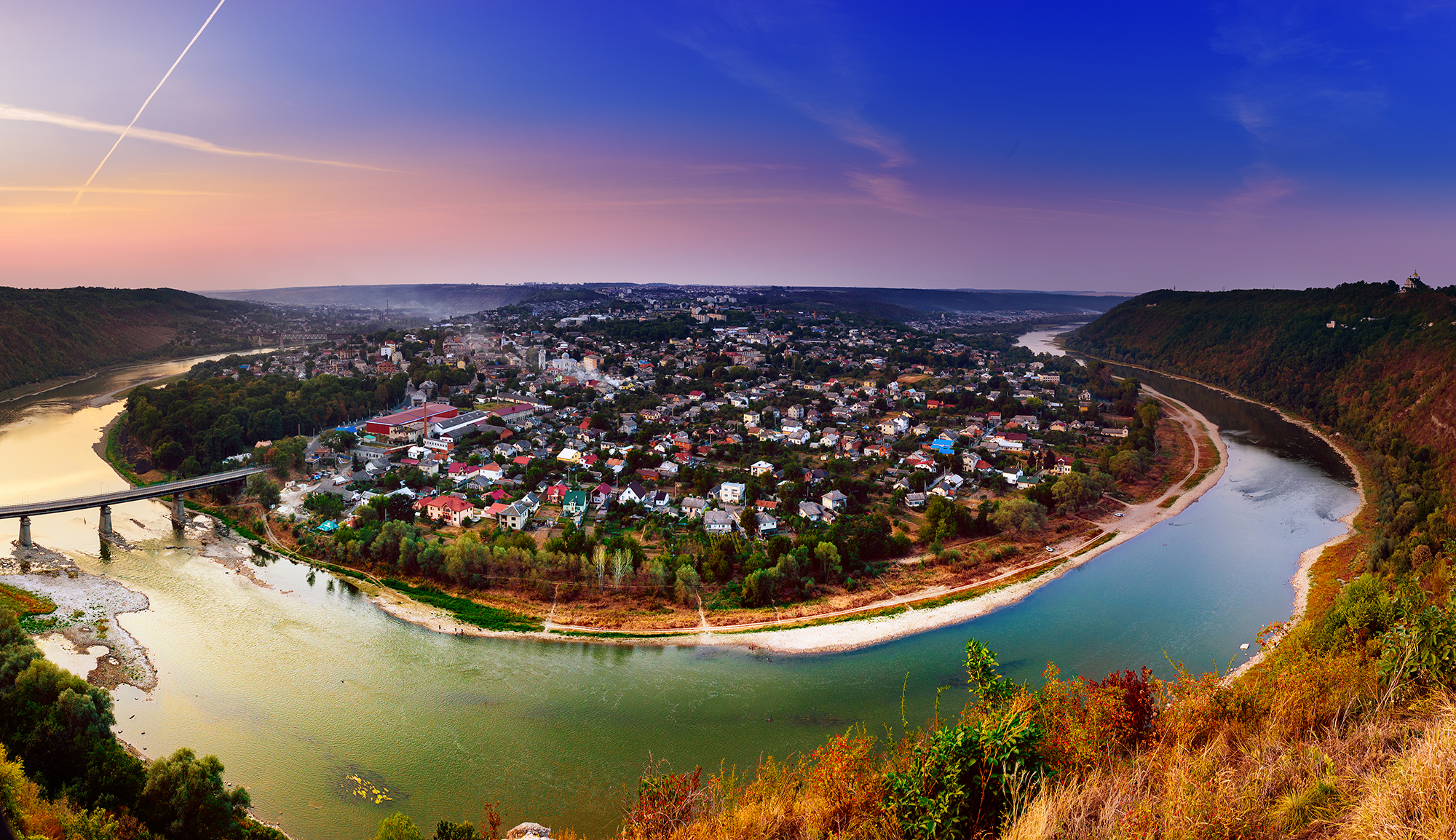
- Skyline of Zalishchyky

- Seal
- Interactive map of Zalishchyky
- Location in Ukraine Zalishchyky (Ternopil Oblast)
- Coordinates: 48°39′N 25°44′E
- Country: Ukraine
- Oblast: Ternopil Oblast
- Raion: Chortkiv Raion
- Hromada: Zalishchyky urban hromada
- First mentioned: 1340

Government
  - Mayor: Ivan Drozd

Area
  - Total: 7.16 km^{2} (2.76 sq mi)

Population (2022)
  - Total: 8,928
- Time zone: UTC+2 (EET)
  - Summer (DST): UTC+3 (EEST)

Zalishchyky or Zalischyky (Ukrainian: Залiщики, IPA: [zɐˈl⁽ʲ⁾iʃtʃɪkɪ]; Polish: Zaleszczyki) is a small city located on the Dniester River in Chortkiv Raion, Ternopil Oblast, western Ukraine. It hosts the administration of Zalishchyky urban hromada, one of the hromadas of Ukraine. Population: 8,928 (2022 estimate).

== Etymology ==
Zalishchyky's name, as well as its precursors Zalissia and Zalishche, probably derives from "zalis", a compound of the Ukrainian words "за" (za) and "ліс" (lis), together meaning "behind (the) forest" (За лісом (Za lisom)). Hinterwalden, the name for a Saxon settlement in Zalishchyky, also shares this etymological root, originating from the German "hinterwald" (itself meaning, literally, "behind forest").

Others theorise the name derives from the Ukrainian word for the hazel plant (Ukrainian: ліщина, romanized: lishchyna), which they attribute to Zalishchyky's initial settlers.

== Geography ==
Zalishchyky is located at the southern edge of Ternopil Oblast near a place where three oblasts (Ternopil, Ivano-Frankivsk, and Chernivtsi) joint together. Geographically the city is located in southeastern Galicia (near historical border with Podillia, which was the river Zbruch), directly opposite the historical land of Bukovina, in valley of Dniester which forms in this area so called Dniester canyon. Through the city passes important European route E85 which connects Baltic coast with the coast of Aegean Sea in northern Greece.

Zalishchyky's climate is quite mild, with grapes, peaches and other fruits growing in the area. It is especially famous for its tomatoes. Since the inter-war era, it has been a centre for the tourist industry. Before the collapse of the Soviet Union, some 10,000 visitors arrived annually. In the interwar period, the town was an important tourist centre of Poland. It is also one of the few wine growing areas in that part of Ukraine.

== History ==
While the first known mention of Zalishchyky is traced back to 1340, the village had already existed for some time, and given its proximity to a number of other prehistoric settlements, probably dates back to the Cucuteni–Trypillia culture of late Paleolithic antiquity. The 'original' Zalishchyky was actually founded in the area just outside of the modern town's borders, on the land that is now the Ukrainian village of Dobrivliany (which existed as a subdivision of the modern city between 1981 and 1986). In 1469, this village was a peasant farming community under the name Zalissia (Залісся) and later Zalishche (Залісще) in the 15th century. In 1569, Zalishchyky was assigned to the Podolian Voivodship, an administrative unit of the Polish–Lithuanian Commonwealth, to which the town became a seat for their county in 1774. In 1578, the village officially adopted the name "Zalishchyky". In 1594, Stanisław Żółkiewski raised an army in Zalishchyky and defended the locale from a Tartar invasion. In 1669, the village was completely destroyed by Turk invaders, and the survivors were almost wiped out under the rule of the sultan Mehmed IV during the better part of the Second Polish–Ottoman War. In 1750, at the invitation of Prince Stanisław Poniatowski, Saxon weavers of Silesian cloth settled on part of an historically older portion of Zalishchyky, and named it Hinterwälden. The establishment marked Zalishchyky's transition from a village to a true town. Hinterwälden still survives today, and is now known as "Old Zalishchyky". In 1766, Zalishchyky received the right to self-governance under the Magdeburg Law. The new town's seal read, Sigillum civitatis (Za)leszczyki. The 1772 census lists 159 Jewish families of varying professions dwelling in Zalishchyky. Between 1772 and 1918 Zalishchyky was ruled by the Austrian states of the Habsburg monarchy, Austrian Empire, and finally Austria-Hungary, though between 1809 and 1816 it was under control of the Russian Empire.

During the 19th century, the area around Zalishchyky was populated primarily by Ukrainian country folk, though the town had a large Polish and Jewish population. By then, the city was associated with the best peaches, plums and grapes in the Austrian Empire. On 18 June 1809, during the War of the Fifth Coalition, the town was the site of a fierce battle (Polish: Bitwa pod Zaleszczykami) that ended with an Austrian victory. In 1838, the commander of Zalishchyky's infantry battalion reported the beginnings of a peasant revolt against the didych (Ukrainian: дідичів), the land owners. No battles or skirmishes actually occurred during this "revolt", instead peasants went on strike and lodged complaints to the district council from the government. The Austrian government took many measures to suppress the peasant discontent, and finally in July 1838 evacuated the district administration and started a riot in Zalishchyky, all the while torturing innocent civilians. In 1863, the town's Christians rioted against the Jewish population after a Jewish business owner attempted to collect on a loan to a Christian storekeeper. In the ensuing chaos, Jews were beaten and Jewish property was destroyed before police from Chernivtsi were able to suppress the incident. Later that same year a Jewish family was butchered in a nearby hamlet. Zalishchyky's synagogue was destroyed in 1871 by a massive fire that also razed 170 houses. At the end of the 19th century, the area around Zalishchyky witnessed large-scale emigration to the New World, especially western Canada.

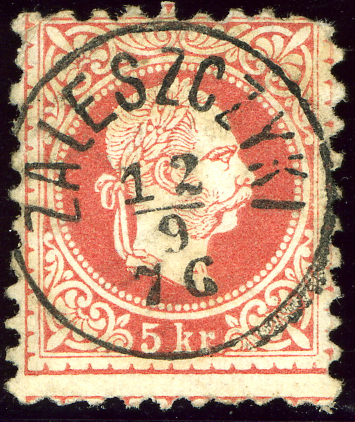
Austrian stamp cancelled Zaleszczyki in 1876

In 1914, Russia captured Zalishchyky, initially killing 30 Jews, before expelling the rest of the town's Jews on 15 April of the following year, many of whom died of typhus and syphilis. Following the end of the First World War in 1917, the town's economy was bilious and many Jews were either widowed or orphaned by the war. The town recovered from its wartime loses thanks to aid from the American Jewish Joint Distribution Committee and Jews from neighboring towns and oblasts. After the dissolution of Austria-Hungary in 1918, Zalishchyky was annexed along with the majority of East Galicia by the short-lived West Ukrainian People's Republic, following which Yevhen Petrushevych was appointed as the town dictator. After the subsequent Polish–Ukrainian War ended in Polish victory, and the total looting of Zalishchyky, the town was again under Polish sovereignty.

Zalishchyky became part of the Tarnopol Voivodeship. Under the Second Polish Republic, Zalishchyky was located in the extreme southeast corner of the country, and developed into a very popular spa, and was dubbed the "Polish Meran" or the "Polish Riviera", especially popular were the sandy beaches located along the Dniester. The town was regarded as the warmest town in Poland and the Polish capital of grapevine, with annual grape festivals taking place here every summer. Zalishchyky had a direct rail connection with Warsaw and Gdynia (the distance of 1,314 kilometres (816 miles), the longest route in the Second Polish Republic). Furthermore, a luxtorpeda fast train connected Zalishchyky with Ternopil. Zalishchyky quickly became the vacation hub for Eastern European tourists, as well as becoming a hub for smuggling, primarily from the Romanian border which the river divided. As a result of flooding and a lack of investment into the city, the alignment of Zalishchyky as a vacation town was short-lived. The town suffered three catastrophic floods in 1863, 1871, and 1927.

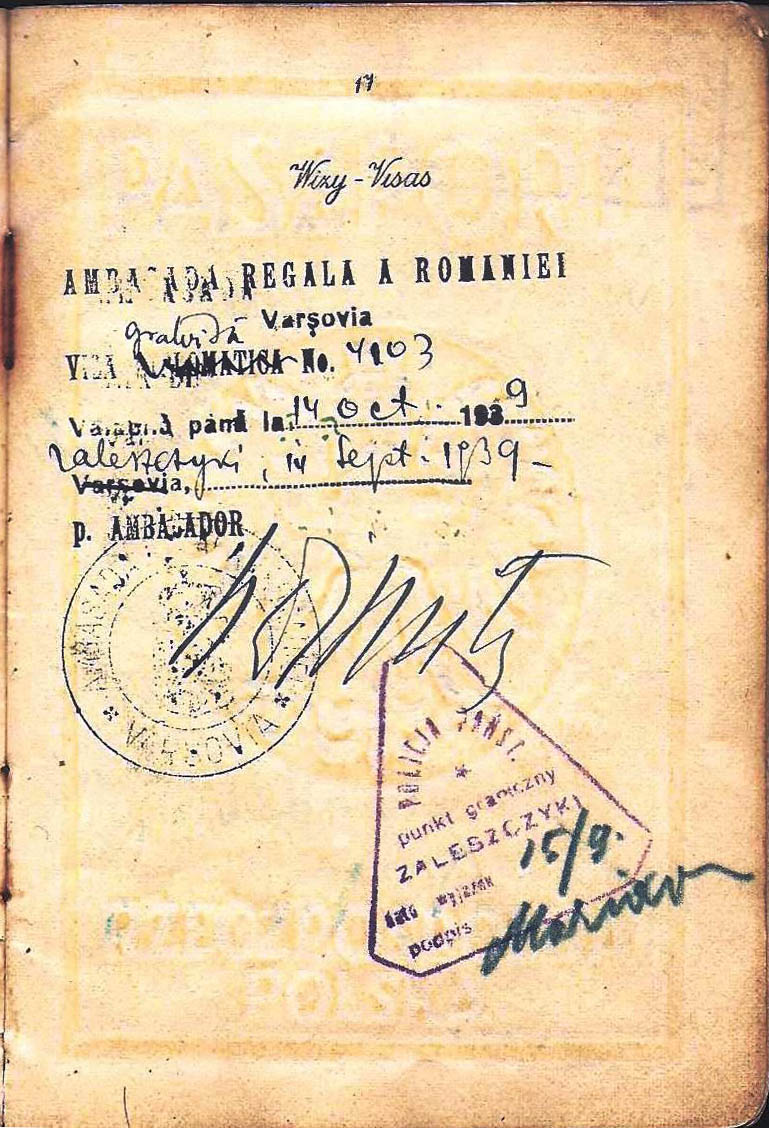
Crossing the border at Zalishchyky into Romania on 15 September 1939, 2 days before the Soviet invasion from the east - passport.

Zalishchyky's already prolific reputation in the world of tourism coupled with the luxtorpeda railways revived Zalishchyky's tourist industry, and the town's economy boomed as it slowly became completely oriented to tourist activity. This bloom lasted until 1939 when Germany commenced the Invasion of Poland, igniting World War II and leading Soviet Ukraine, a constituent republic of the Soviet Union, to annex Zalishchyky on 17 September, during the Polish September Campaign.

After Soviet capture and occupation of Zalishchyky, the beaches and orchards were destroyed, the Baroque town hall was demolished, and a monument of Lenin was erected in its spot. The Roman Catholic church of St. Stanislaus was devastated, and turned into fertilizer storage. All Jewish activity ceased, with the exception of some continuing education in Yiddish schools. Following the onset of the war, many officials from the Polish government and military travelled through Zalishchyky en route to Romania, whose borders still remain within a considerably short distance from the modern town.

In early July 1941, on a date not certainly known, the Soviets drowned close to a thousand civilians in the Dniester in what became the Zalishchyky tragedy. On 8 July 1941, German forces entered Zalishchyky and immediately began persecuting the town's Jews – more than 3,700 civilians from Zalishchyky and the surrounding locales were murdered. Many were sent to be slave labor in Nazi-controlled Zhvanets in the fall. On 14 November, several Jews were deported to work camps, 200 to Kamianka-Buzka, and 40 to numerous smaller locales, such as Kutno. Shortly after, 800 Jews were forced to the outskirts of Zalishchyky, where they were murdered. In 2011, a monument was erected near the execution site (now a sports stadium). The proper site of the execution was developed with residential houses and garages after the end of the Second World War.

Much of the town died of hunger and typhoid in the winter of 1941, and Jews were moved to neighboring ghettos, mainly to Tłuste, beginning on 20 September 1942. From Tłuste, most of them were shipped to Bełżec extermination camp, others died during deportations. Only a few dozen survived. Some were able to escape to areas such as Tashkent thanks to Soviet evacuations and deportations during the war.

In March 1944, the region was liberated by the Russians, before briefly returning to German control, during which many Jews were murdered by the panicking Nazis. After being liberated a second time by the 1st Ukrainian Front on 24 March, survivors and some of those deported returned to Zalishchyky. While the Nazi forces had been defeated, conditions hardly improved. While Moscow lauded the liberation of the city, even naming a battle division after the city, Communist control soon proved to be worse than Nazi occupation in many ways. Starting less than a day after liberation, denizens of Zalishchyky were arrested by SMERSH and presumably murdered by operatives of the NKVD. In October, more than 800 citizens from Zalishchyky were forcibly drafted by the Soviets to so called penal military units (Russian: штрафной батальон, Shtrafbaty) to fight in the Baltic Offensive, less than 20 survived.

After the war, the town was largely repaired, as industrial plants, buildings, and roads were rebuilt and recommissioned. In addition, canneries were widely re-established, leading to the opening of bakeries, dairy plants, corn-calibrating plants, as well as factories which produced textiles and other consumer goods. Quite a few of these industries lasted until the fall of the Soviet Union, after which they collapsed following the Ukraine's transition from the Soviet planned economy. Nonetheless, the city's economy continues to be concentrated on light industry, particularly the agrarian sector.

In 2016, Zalishchyky celebrated the 250th anniversary of township under the Magdeburg Law with a holiday commemorating the city. A two-day long "Zalishchyky Fest" ensued. Concurrently, Zalishchyky's government has begun work on repairing infrastructure, such as asphalt repair, paved lighting, new lights, benches, litter bins, and a number of improvements to either of the city's local parks; one of which, the Zalishchyky Central Park, houses a number of historic monuments and rare species of flora. This park and Zalishchyky Park which lies to the south are a Ukrainian national park.

Until 18 July 2020, Zalishchyky was the administrative centre of Zalishchyky Raion. The raion was abolished in July 2020 as part of the administrative reform of Ukraine, which reduced the number of raions of Ternopil Oblast to three. The area of Zalishchyky Raion was merged into Chortkiv Raion.

== Archaeology and monuments ==
Before the Second World War, the area around Zalishchyky became a major centre of archaeological attention. Near various villages, especially Koshylivtsi (Ukrainian: Кошилівці), a little north of the Dniester, excavations were carried out which uncovered statues, coins, and other artefacts from as far back as the Neolithic Cucuteni-Trypillian culture, and extending through the period of the Roman Empire and the Migration Period in the Early Middle Ages.

Zalishchyky contains a 17th-century Roman Catholic church, an 18th-century Town Hall and other monuments.

== Points of interest ==
- Roman Catholic Church of St. Stanislaus, founded by the King of Poland Stanisław II Augustus in 1763, and completed in 1828. The church served as a storage in 1946–1992. Currently, it is under renovation
- The Poniatowski Palace, built in the late 18th century, and remodelled in 1831. It was property of Duke Józef Poniatowski, in the 19th century belonged to the Brunicki family. Its last owners was the Turnau family
- The Pilsudski Villa, where in 1933 Józef Piłsudski stayed
- The 19th century Roman Catholic cemetery
- The manor house of Jan Kasprowicz, a Polish poet who lived here in 1896–1899

== Gallery ==
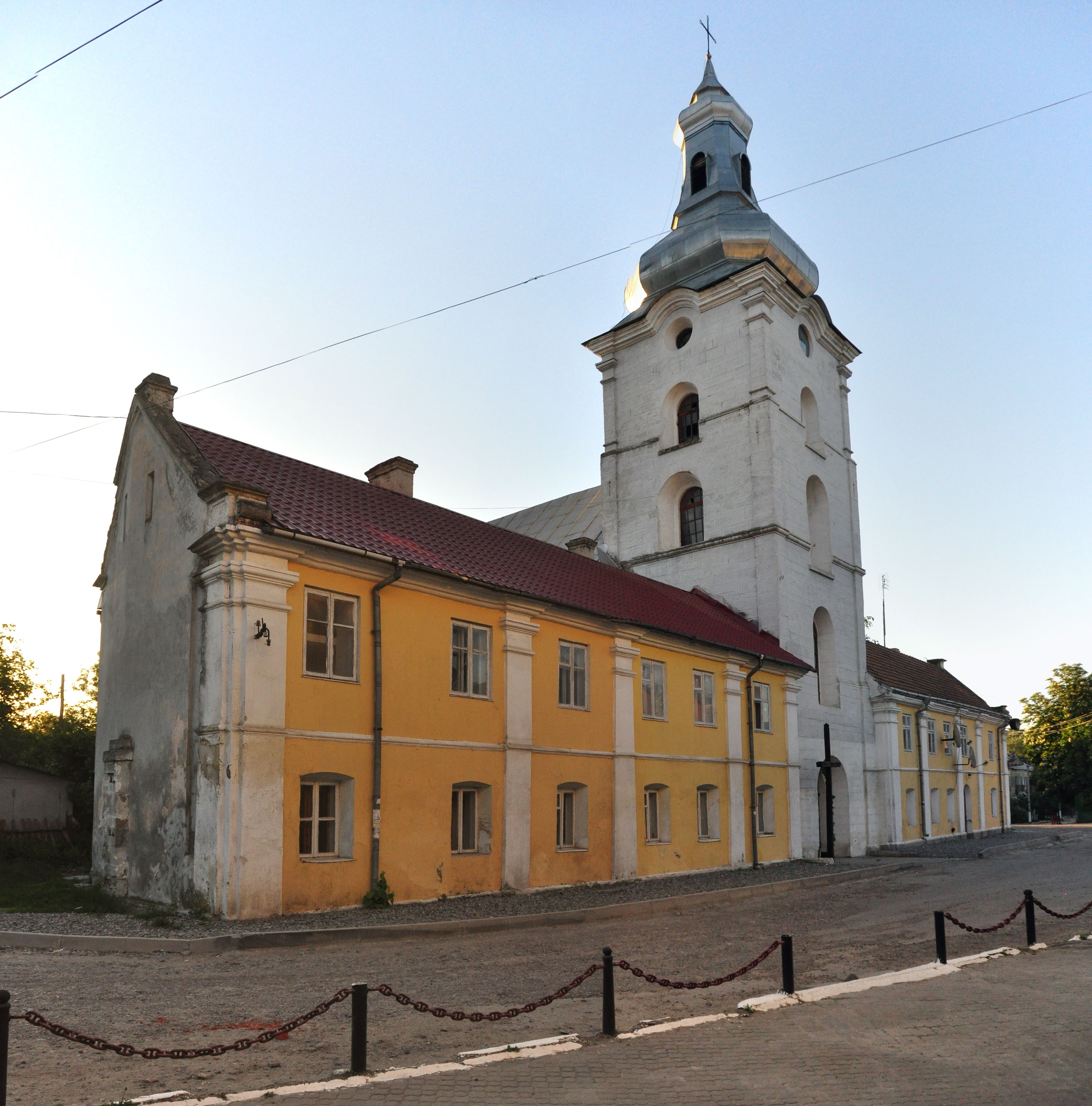
Roman Catholic Church of St. Stanislaus

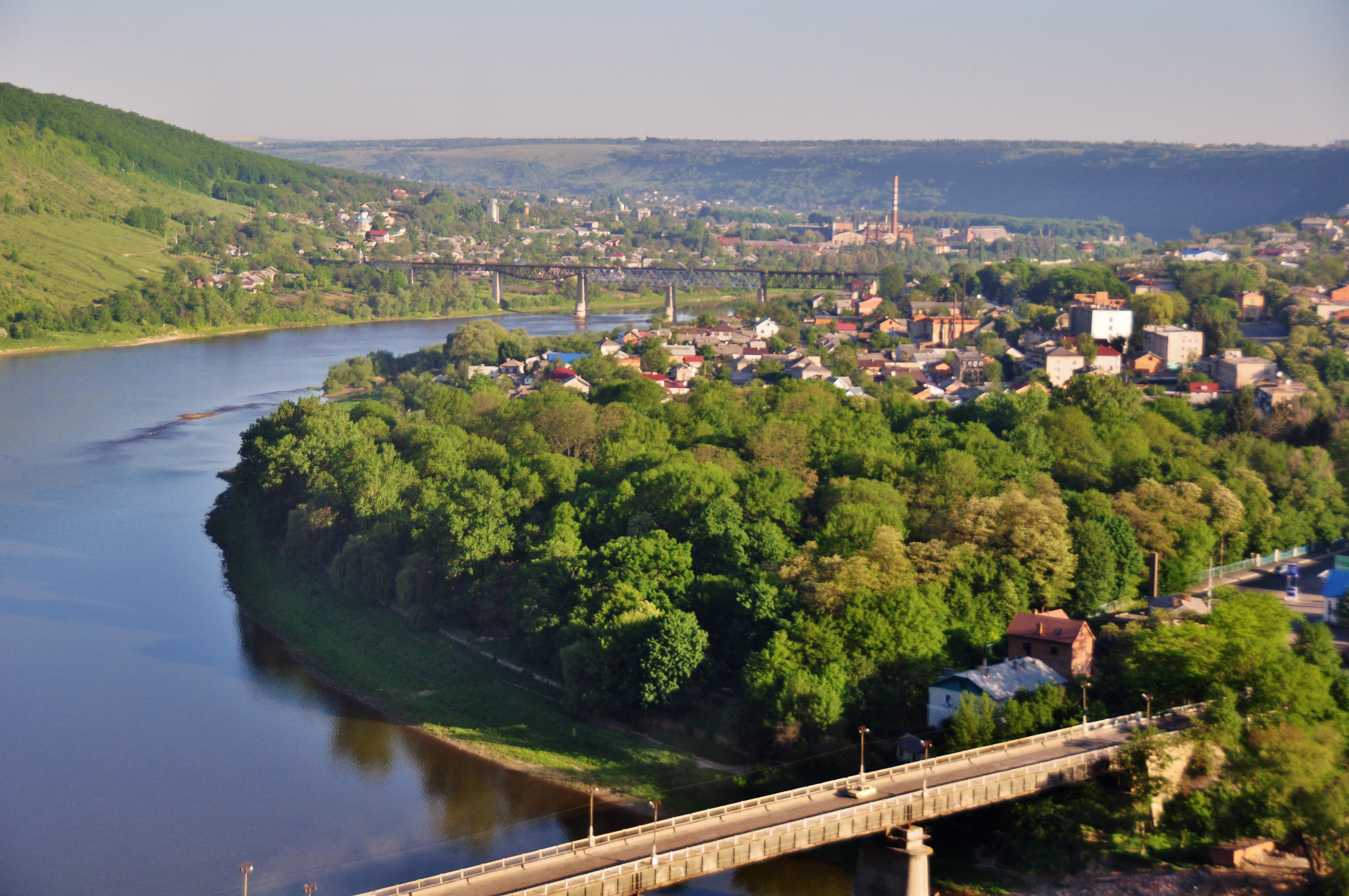
City park and bridges over the Dniester

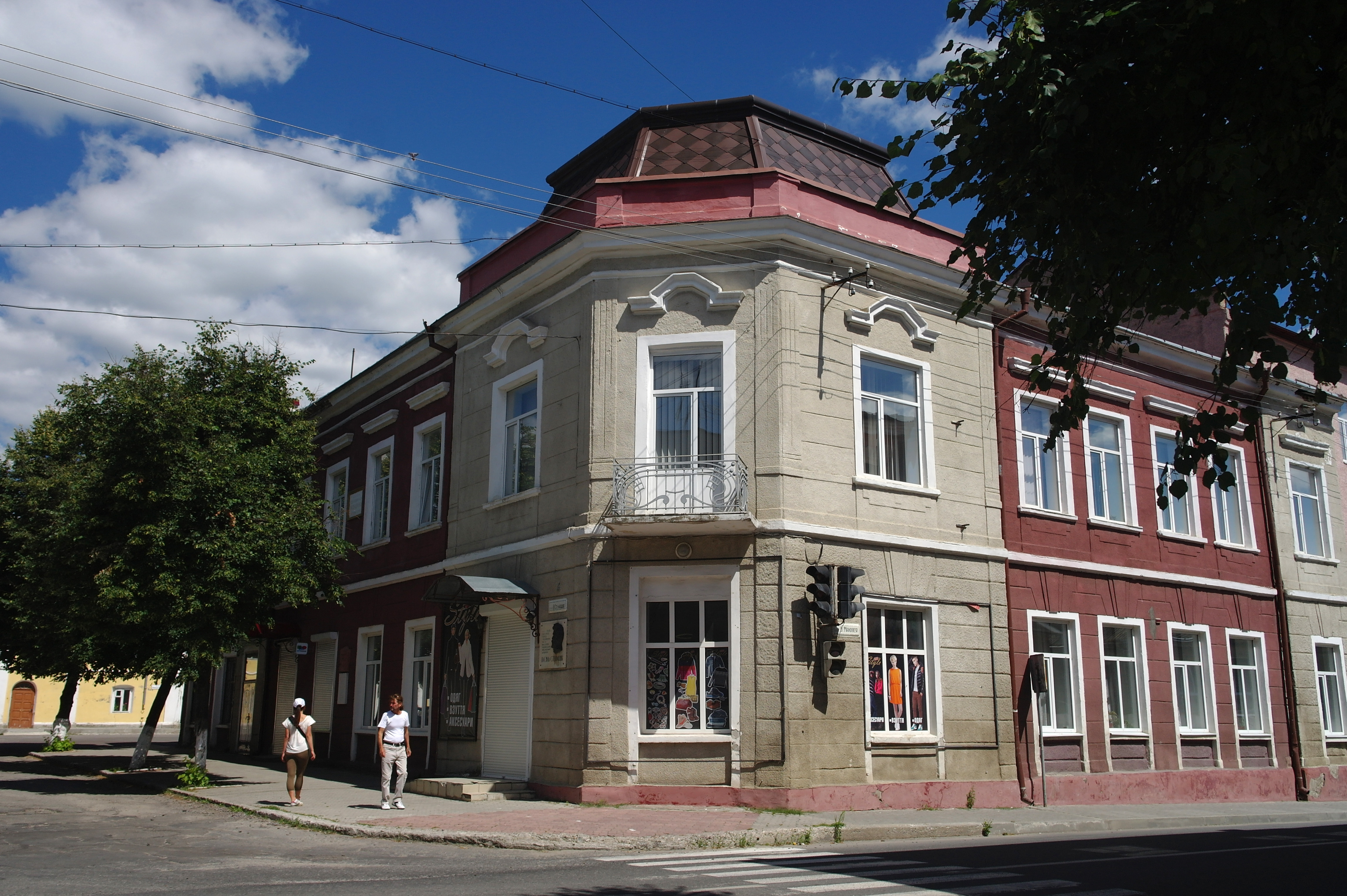
Office buildings

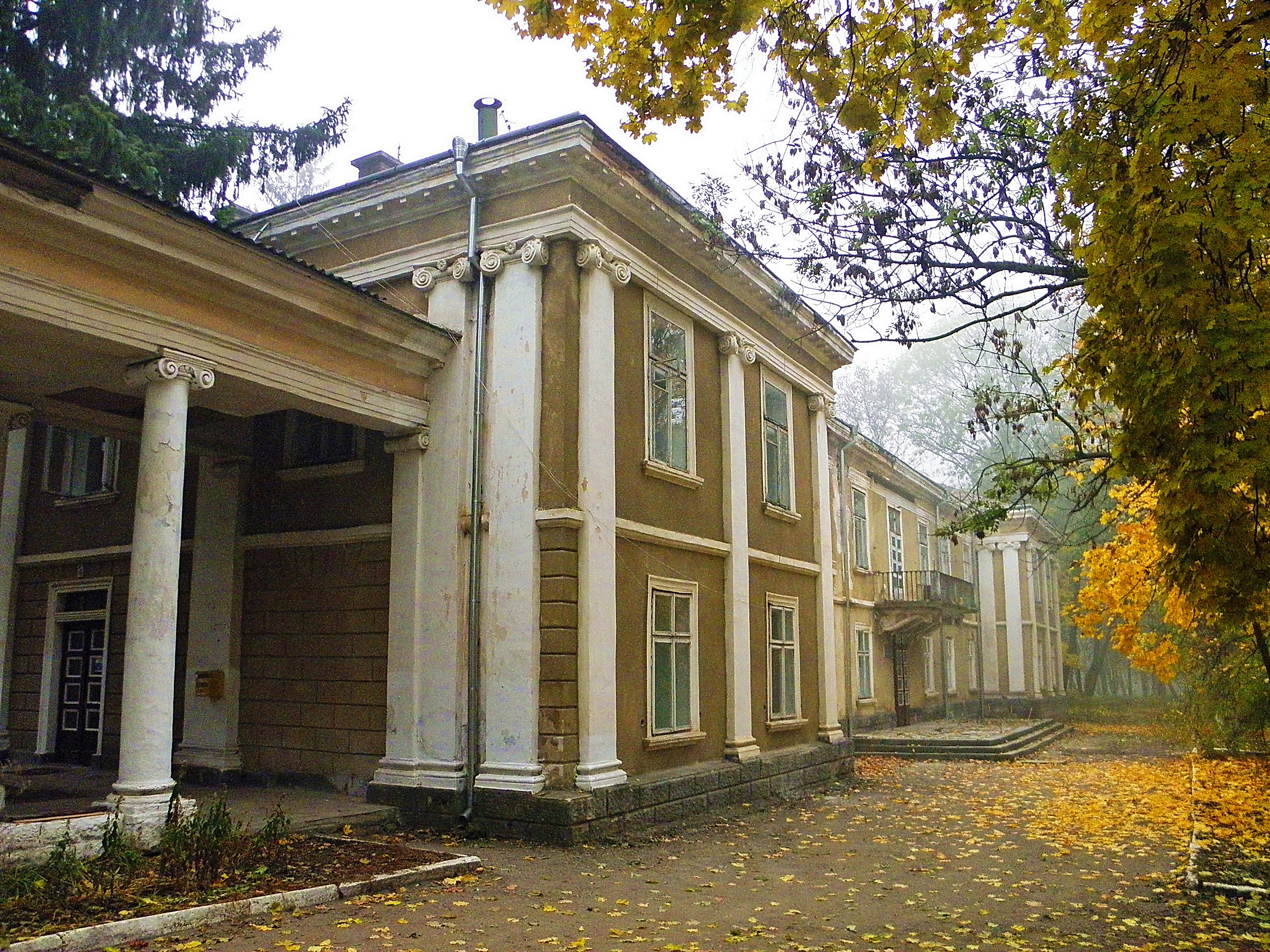
Bruniste Palace

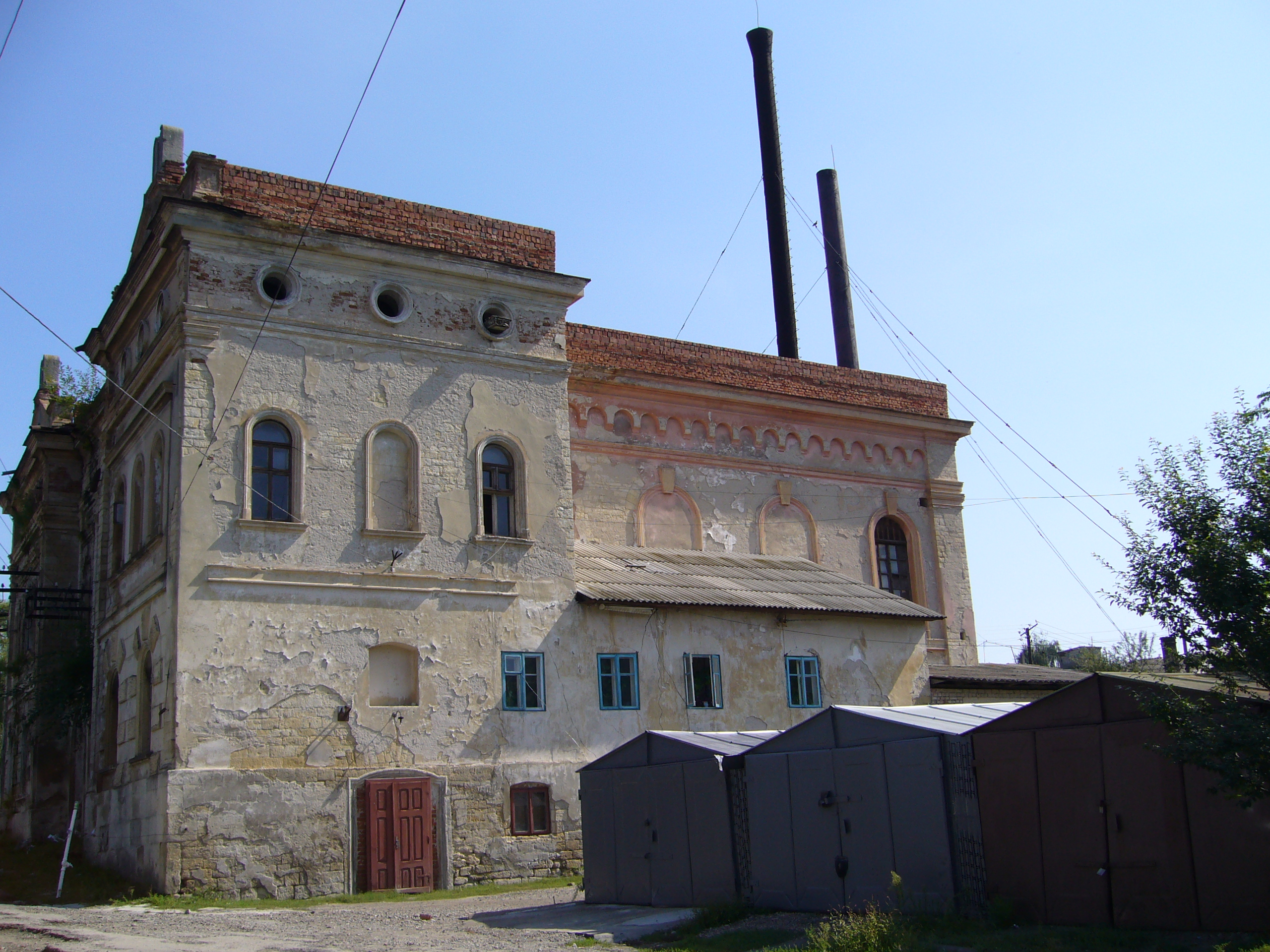
Ruins of the fire-gutted synagogue

== Notable people ==
- Mykhailo Orest Haivoronsky — Ukrainian composer, musician, conductor, teacher, violinist, and critic
- Osyp Makovei — Ukrainian writer, critic, literary historian, publicist, translator, educator and public figure
- Vasyl Lopukh — Ukrainian public figure and economist
- Leon Biliński – politician and economist, rector of Lviv University
- Carl Gustaf Emil Mannerheim — Marshal and sixth president of Finland was in the town during the First World War

== International relations ==
=== Twin towns – Sister cities ===
Zalishchyky is twinned with:

- Bytów, Poland
