= Luxtorpeda =

Polish railcar

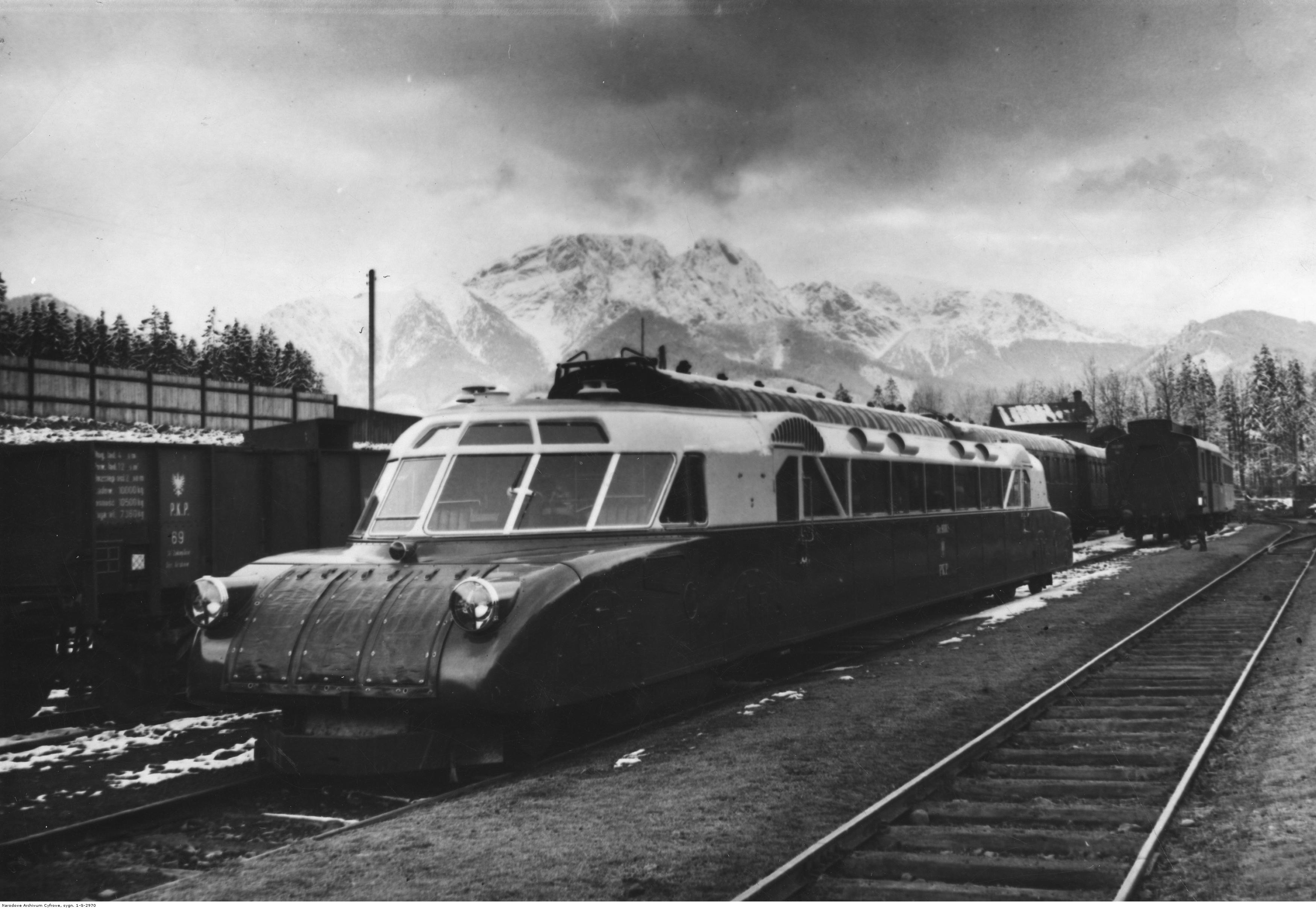
- Fablok Luxtorpeda at Zakopane station (1930s)
- In service: Austro-Daimler: 1933–1939; Fablok: 1936–1954
- Manufacturer: Austro-Daimler; Pierwsza Fabryka Lokomotyw w Polsce Sp. Akc. (Fablok)
- Number built: Austro-Daimler: 1; Fablok: 5
- Formation: Single car
- Fleet numbers: Austro-Daimler: SAx90080; Fablok: SAx90081–SAx90085
- Operators: PKP
- Depots: Kraków

Specifications
- Car length: 22.5 m (74 ft)
- Width: Austro-Daimler: 2.8 m (9.2 ft); Fablok: 2.817 m (9.24 ft)
- Height: Austro-Daimler: 2.64 m (8.7 ft); Fablok: 2.638 m (8.65 ft)
- Doors: 4
- Articulated sections: 1
- Wheel diameter: 1.03 m (3 ft 5 in)
- Wheelbase: between bogie centres: 17 m (56 ft); bogie: Austro-Daimler: 3 m (9.8 ft); Fablok: 3.07 m (10.1 ft)
- Maximum speed: Austro-Daimler: 100 km/h (62 mph); Fablok: 115 km/h (71 mph)
- Weight: Austro-Daimler: 19.6 t (19.3 long tons; 21.6 short tons); Fablok: 22 t (22 long tons; 24 short tons)
- Prime mover(s): Austro-Daimler: 2 × petrol; Fablok: 2 × diesel
- Engine type: Austro-Daimler: 2 × Austro-Daimler AD 640; Fablok: 2 × MAN D4086
- Cylinder count: Austro-Daimler: 6 ea.; Fablok: 6 ea.
- Cylinder size: Austro-Daimler: 85 mm × 115 mm (3.3 in × 4.5 in); Fablok: 140 mm × 180 mm (5.5 in × 7.1 in)
- Power output: Austro-Daimler: 80 PS (59 kW; 79 hp) @ 3,000 rpm ea.; Fablok: 125 PS (92 kW; 123 hp) @ 1,350 rpm ea.
- Transmission: hydraulic Voith
- UIC classification: (1A)(A1)
- Minimum turning radius: 140 m (460 ft)
- Seating: Austro-Daimler: 56 + 18 folding; Fablok: 52–56 + 4 folding
- Track gauge: 1,435 mm (4 ft 8 1/2 in)

Notes/references

Luxtorpeda was the colloquial name of a famous Polish railcar from the 1930s, operating express services primarily from Kraków to other Polish cities.

== History ==
In April 1933, Austrian company Austro-Daimler demonstrated their new railcar for long-distance express connections, to PKP. During one of the demonstration runs, between Warsaw and Skierniewice, the railcar reached speed about 130 km/h (80 mph). The railcar was leased and later purchased by PKP, further five units were ordered from Fablok who were to build them under Austrian licence but with various improvements.

Klemens Stefan Sielecki, an engineer at The First Factory of Locomotives in Poland Ltd. (usually referred to as Fablok) in Chrzanów, in 1935 became highly involved in the development of the construction of Luxtorpeda, which was a technical innovation in its time. Also in 1935 he was appointed deputy head of the technical department. In 1936 Fablok built five Polish Luxtorpedas under his guidance. The Luxtorpedas by Fablok were slightly different from their Austrian counterparts, the biggest difference being the use of more powerful diesel engines thanks to which were able to reach a speed of 115 km/h (71 mph).

Luxtorpedas were allocated a PKP class SAx (meaning: S – diesel or petrol vehicle, A – 1st class, x – four axles) and numbered 90080 (Austrian-made) and 90081 to 90085 (Polish-made). Despite being classified as a 1st class, railcar, it was not really that luxurious (see § Other information below).

Austro-Daimler also manufactured 4 units for Austrian Railways where they served, as class VT 63, until mid-1940s.

== Technical data ==
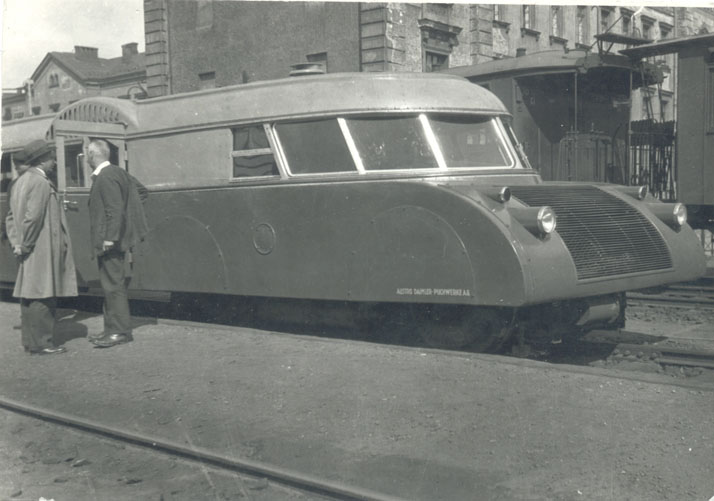
Austro-Daimler Luxtorpeda at Kraków station (1930s)

The railcars were bi-directional and, therefore, did not require turning at termini. The railcars' wheels had pneumatic tyres with tubes between the wheels proper and the steel tyres (the external parts that contact rails). They gave very smooth and quiet rides.

It was decided to power Polish-built Luxtorpedas by diesel engines MAN AG D4086, rather than petrol engines like the Austrian prototype. Main reasons were lower fuel cost and reduced risk of fire and explosion. The water-cooled engines were mounted at each end of the railcar, at the front of the driving cabins. Transmission was hydraulic (torque converter and fluid coupling), supplied by Voith. Each engine had its own mechanical reversing gear and transmission, both located underneath the cabin. The speed of both engines could be controlled from one cab, but starting and stopping them, reversing, as well as switching between the two transmission systems (at the speed around 75–80 km/h (47–50 mph)), had to be done independently for each engine. Therefore, in most cases two drivers were needed. They communicated with each other using a signalling system that consisted of a set of colour lights and an electric bell. At some point both transmissions' controls were connected, enabling a one-person operation.

The maximum speed reached by Fablok-built railcars during trials was 120 km/h (70 mph), with 100–105 km/h (62–65 mph) set as a practical operational maximum.

Due to the lack of buffers and couplings it was impossible to join the railcars together, or to attach a Luxtorpeda to ordinary rolling stock. Therefore, Luxtorpedas always ran singly. However, a towing rod, 1.4 m long, was carried in each railcar for emergency coupling to standard railway rolling stock.

== Routes ==
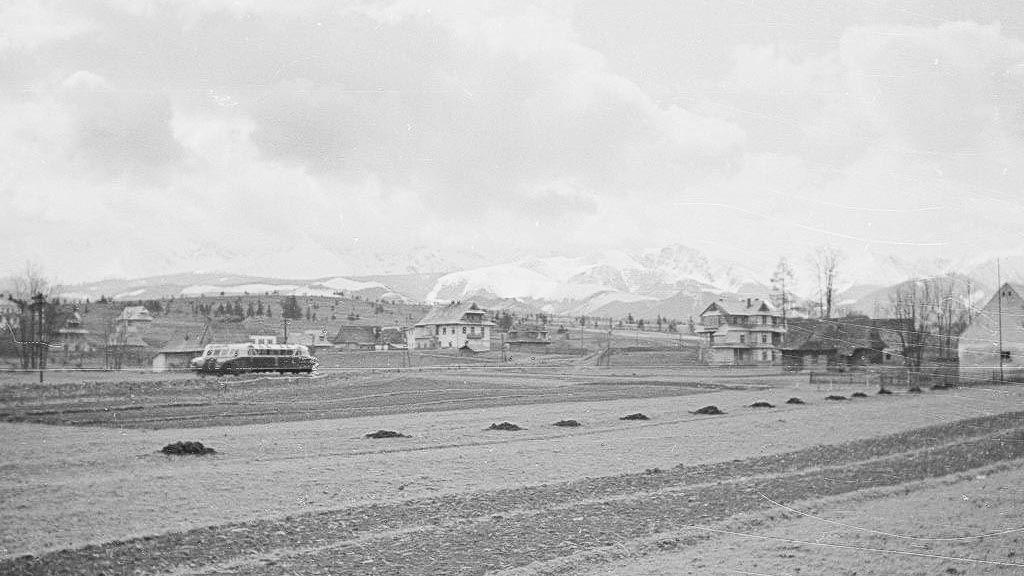
Fablok Luxtorpeda on the way to Zakopane (1930s)

The Luxtorpedas' main base was Kraków, and from there they ran to the Tatra Mountains resort of Zakopane. The 147-kilometre (91 mi) distance between the two cities, a difficult route with many reverse curves of 190 m (620 ft) radius and grades of up to 2.7%, was covered, on average, in 2 hours and 45 minutes. In 1936 a Luxtorpeda set a record of 2 hours and 18 minutes. This record still stands. Luxtorpedas also ran from Kraków to Warsaw, Katowice, other mountain resorts and Krynica via Tarnów.

== Final years ==
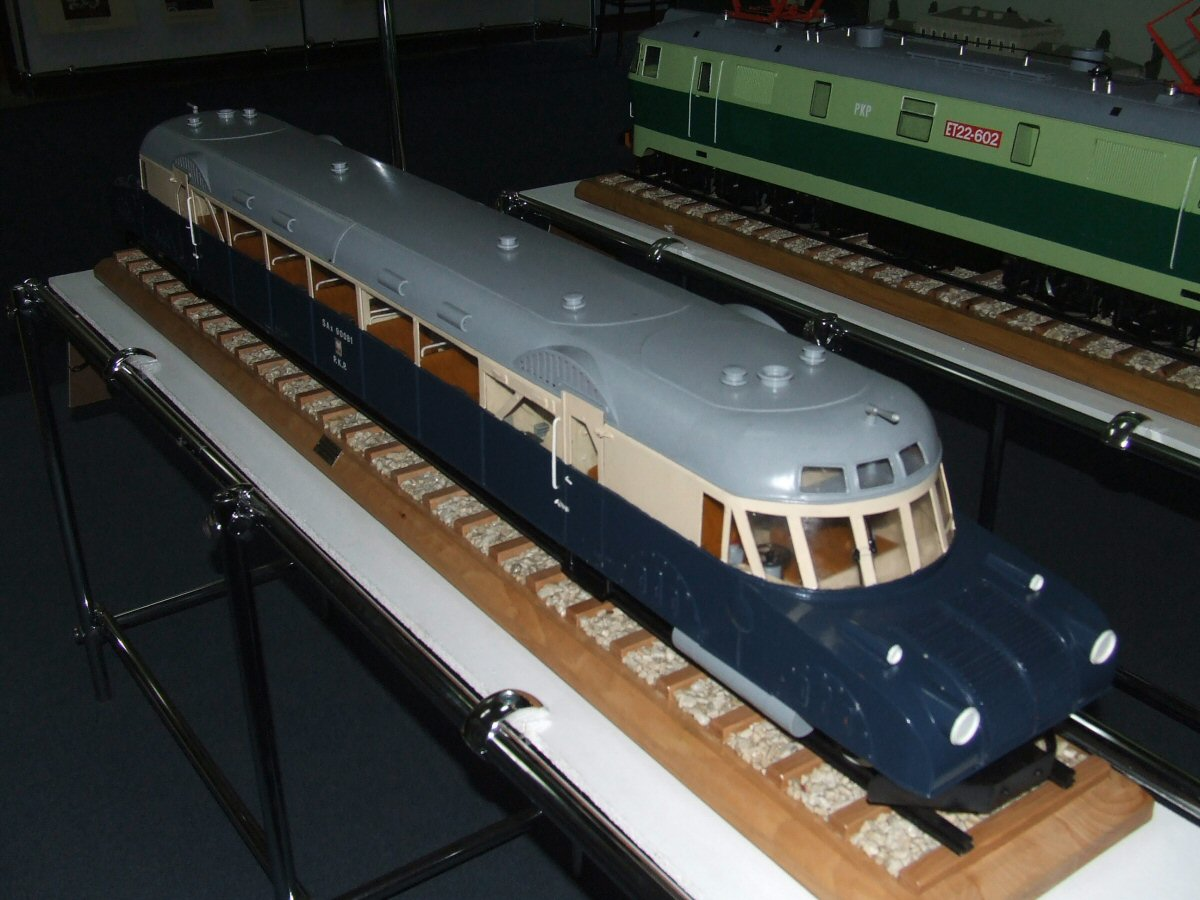
Model of the Luxtorpeda at the Warsaw Railway Museum

After the Polish September Campaign, only 90081 and 90084 stationed in Kraków remained serviceable, the other railcars having been destroyed. They were used as special "Nur für Deutsche (Only for Germans)" trains, travelling from Kraków to Zakopane and Krynica. After World War II, only 90081 remained in Poland and was repaired using parts from destroyed cars. 90084 was found in the Schwerin division of DR at the end of 1945 However, due to the lack of parts and suitable maintenance workshops, 90081 could not be made to run at anywhere near its design speed and was allocated to operate local services near Trzebinia. It was scrapped around 1954.

== Other information ==
Luxtorpeda (roughly translated as English: luxury torpedo) was not the official name of these railcars. The common name was inspired by the unusual look of the railcar – streamlined, its low height (some 1.5 m lower than the standard rail carriage) and its high speed. Luxtorpedas looked like a cross between a limousine and a bus. But it was hardly luxurious – there was no space to stretch legs and, even though travel along the longest routes took some four hours, there was no onboard buffet.

PKP also had other fast railcars, some capable of reaching 130 km/h (80 mph). These were sometimes called "Luxtorpedas" too.

In the timetable all fast trains operated by railcars were classed as "Pociąg Motorowo-Ekspresowy MtE" ("Motor-Express Train", Motor then meaning an internal combustion engine).

Some claim that fares for Luxtorpeda-run trains were exorbitant, about the same (or higher) as airplane fares. In fact, as per a ministerial regulation of 1935, the fare was the same as the 3rd class limited-stop train fare plus a compulsory seat reservation fee. The regulation came into force well before the Polish-built Luxtorpedas were delivered to PKP.

== Literature ==
- Urzedowy rozklad jazdy i lotow Polskich Kolei Panstwowych "Lato 1939", Warszawa 1939 (Polish State Railroads Official Schedule Summer 1939, Warsaw 1939) See: Polish State Railroads Summer 1939
- Pokropiński, Bogdan (2007). Lux-topeda PKP (2 ed.). Warszawa: WKŁ. ISBN 978-83-206-0694-2. OCLC 500714039.
- Krasnowolski, Bogusław, ed. (2004), Fablok w Chrzanowie. Monografia, Warsaw: Studio Reklamy ateFOKA, ISBN 83-918844-8-1, OCLC 749416038
