= Fablok =

Polish locomotive manufacturer

Fablok S.A.

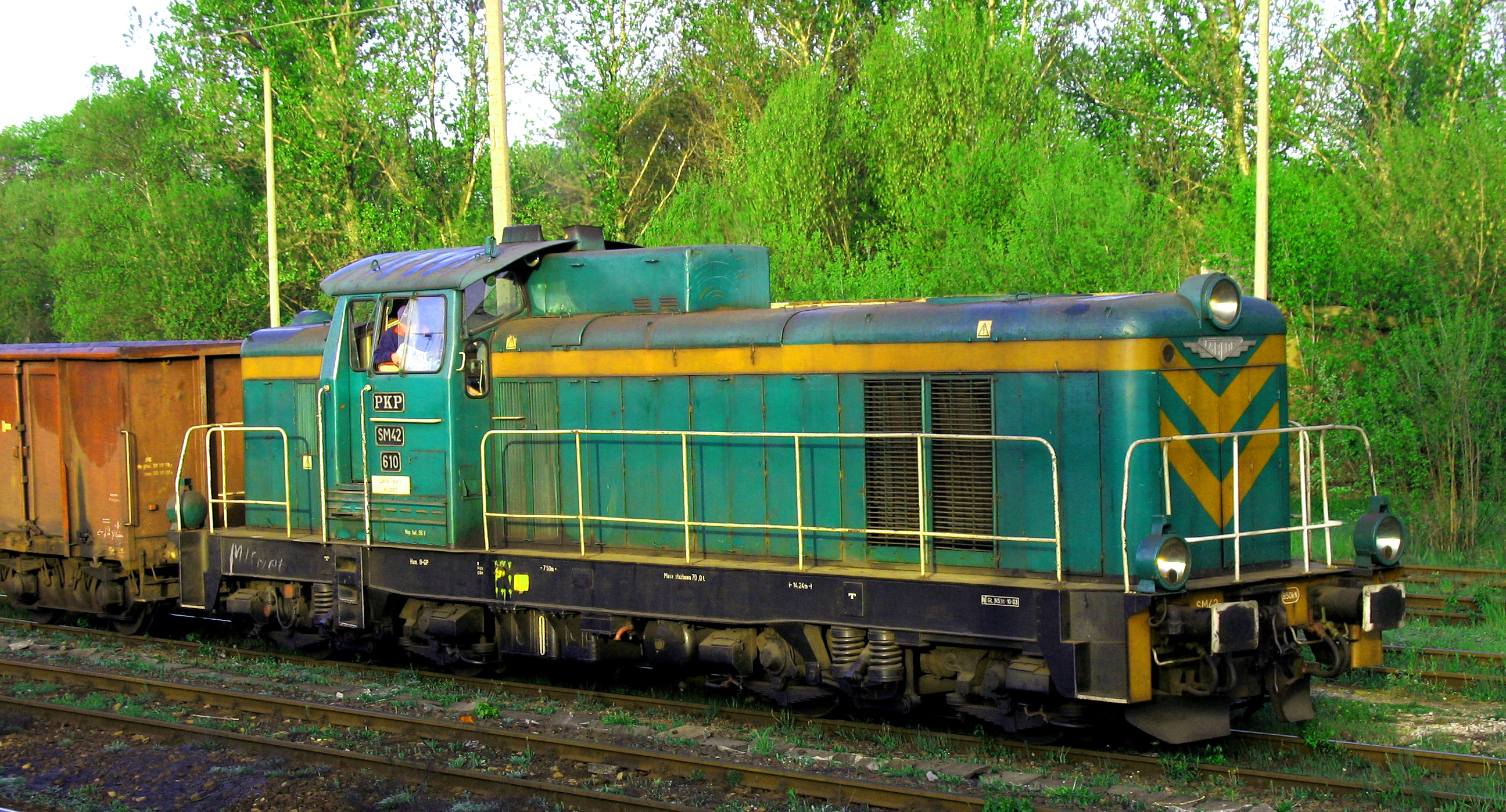
- Fablok SM42-610 locomotive
- Industry: Rail transport
- Area served: Worldwide
- Products: Locomotives
- Owner: Marcin Mistarz
- Website: www.fablok.com.pl

Fablok is a Polish manufacturer of locomotives, based in Chrzanów. Until 1947 the official name was First Factory of Locomotives in Poland Ltd. (Polish: Pierwsza Fabryka Lokomotyw w Polsce Sp. Akc.), Fablok being a widely used syllabic abbreviation of Fabryka Lokomotyw, among others as the company's telegraphic address. It is now named "BUMAR - FABLOK S.A.". Fablok is located in the town of Chrzanów in Lesser Poland. As of 2009, Fablok no longer builds new locomotives.

== History ==
=== Early years 1919-1939 ===
Fablok was established in 1919. A year later a contract was signed with the Polish government to supply 1,200 steam locomotives within ten years to the Polish State Railways (PKP). The first locomotive was delivered on 7 April 1924.

In 1931, Fablok built the first diesel locomotive made in Poland, designated Fablok G1C. It was intended only for works transportation, but the locomotive was proven too weak, the next test runs occurred in 1939.

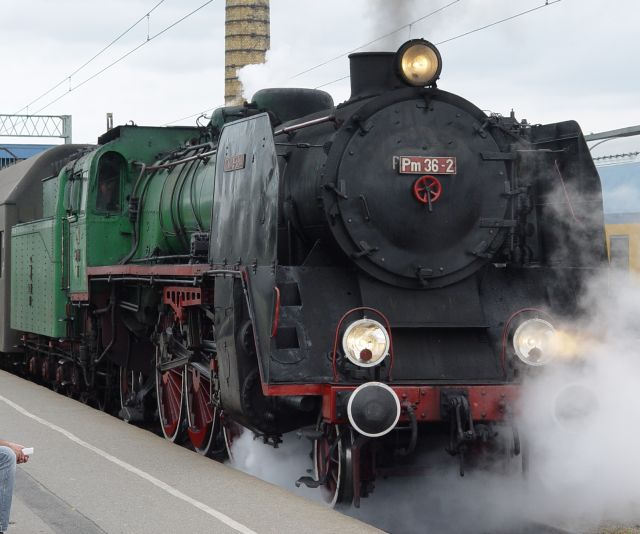
Pm36-2

the first locomotive was exported to the Bulgarian State Railways. During 1935 and 1936, five electric locomotives were built under license from Metropolitan-Vickers. In 1935–1936, Fablok produced five Luxtorpedas (fast railcars) for PKP under the guidance of engineer Klemens Stefan Sielecki. They were based on the Austro-Daimler's design, but substantially modified.

Two experimental fast steam locomotives were built in 1937. One of them (Pm36-1) had aerodynamic fairing, the other had a standard look. The idea was to test both engines in parallel to compare top speed, acceleration, coal and water consumption, etc. The Pm36-1 won a gold medal at the International Exposition of Art and Technology in 1937.

=== World War II 1939-1945 ===
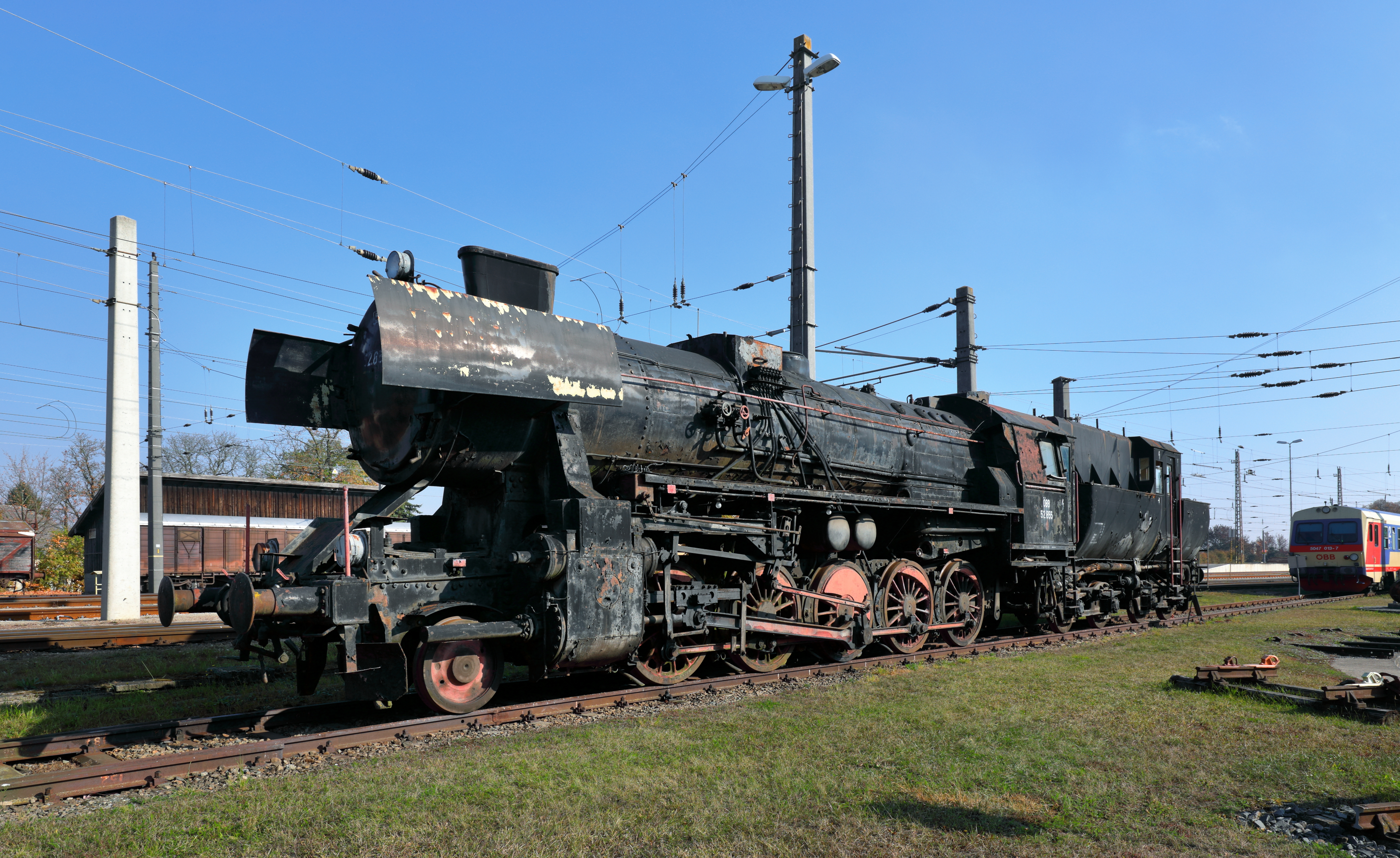
Steam locomotive 52.855, built in 1944 by the Oberschlesische Lokomotivwerke Krenau

During World War II Fablok was a part of the Association of German Locomotives Companies (German: Deutsche Lokomotivbau-Vereinigung). Fablok was incorporated into Henschel & Son under the name Erste Lokomotivfabrik in Polen A.G. Chrzanow (1939–1941) and from 1941 as Oberschlesische Lokomotivwerke Krenau. Klemens Stefan Sielecki together with his colleagues from the technical bureau started hiding the technical documentation for steam, industrial diesel and electric locomotives and moved them completely out of the plant in January 1945, since the Nazis wanted them destroyed. After Poland was liberated, this documentation proved vital for the reconstruction efforts of the national railway industry, especially the diesel and electric locomotives. This allowed Fablok to restart the production of these types.

=== During communism 1945-1989 ===
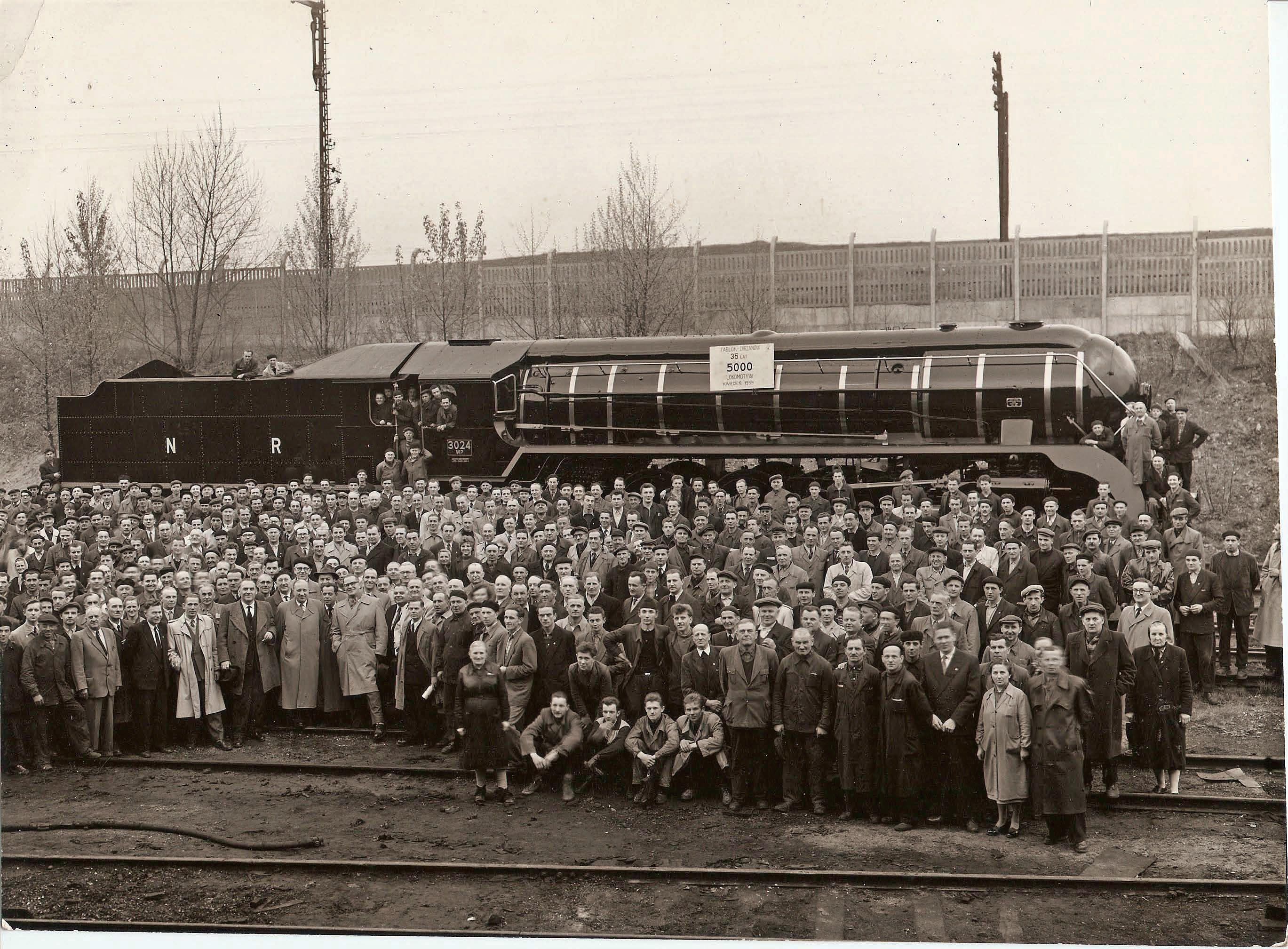
Group photo of Fablok employees celebrating the production of Indian locomotive class WP #5000, in 1959.

The company was nationalized in 1947, and the official name changed to Fablok. Sielecki was a technical director in the post-war years until 1964. After that, he was a technical advisor to the board until his retirement on March 31, 1971. Under his leadership, the production was re-established for multiple types of locomotives, 12 of that type were destined for export.

Export markets for its standard-gauge passenger, fast, freight, and industrial steam locomotives were Albania, China, Hungary, India, Korea, Romania, and Vietnam. Narrow-gauge units were exported to Albania, Bulgaria, China, Romania, the Soviet Union, and Yugoslavia. The last steam locomotive was produced in 1963. Fablok never produced boilers for its steam locomotives, these were supplied by Fabryka Budowy Kotłów (Boiler Construction Works) of Sosnowiec known as Fitzner and Gamper before 1945; later also by other producers.

Production of diesel locomotives started in 1948. From the early 1960s, the product range diversified into rolling stock (rail and tram) components. In 1977, the production profile expanded into construction equipment and its name was changed into Fabryka Maszyn Budowlanych i Lokomotyw BUMAR-FABLOK (Factory of Building Machinery and Locomotives BUMAR-FABLOK). The factory was taken over by Zjednoczenie Przemyslu Maszyn Budowlanych BUMAR (BUMAR Association of Building Machinery Industry) in Warsaw. Production included excavators with a bucket capacity of 1.2 cubic metre, cranes with 25-28 ton lifting capacity, self-propelled road cranes, and hydraulic telescopic jibs.

=== After 1990 to present ===
In 1999, the company received ISO 9001 certification. The "Fablok" Employees’ Joint Stock Company (JSC) was formed and registered in 2001. After first purchasing of 60% of the controlling shares of Bumar-Fablok JSC by "FABLOK" - Employees’ Joint Stock Company from the 7th State Investment Fund (part of the privatization reforms) in 2003, the "Bumar-Fablok" Joint Stock Company ownership was transferred to the Fablok Employees’ Joint Stock Company.

On April 3, 2009, the name of the company was changed to Pierwsza Fabryka Lokomotyw w Polsce “Fablok” S.A (First Factory of Locomotives in Poland “Fablok” Joint Stock Company).

On 21 May 2013, a court in Kraków had announced the Bankruptcy of the company. The wealth of Fablok was bought by Martech Plus with Headquarters in Łaziska Górne.
