= Volodymyr Dobrianskyi =

Ukrainian scientist, archaeologist, historian, speleologist

- Володимир Казимирович Добрянський
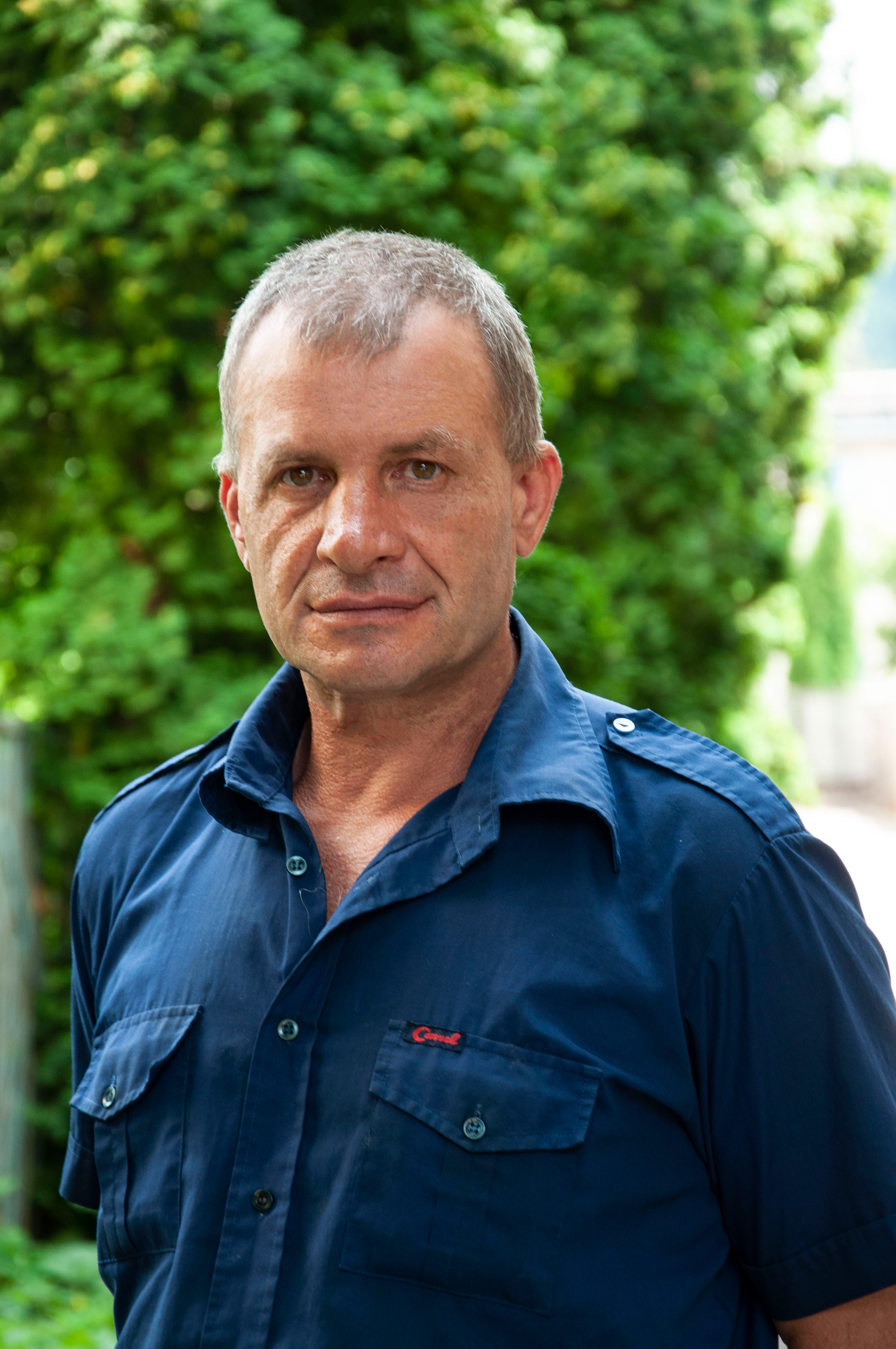
- Born: 12 December 1966 (age 59); Horodok, Ternopil Oblast, Ukrainian SSR, Soviet Union
- Education: Chernivtsi University
- Occupations: Scientist, archaeologist, historian, speleologist, and researcher of antiquities, fortifications and toponymy
- Awards: Petro Medvedyk Prize

Volodymyr Kazymyrovych Dobrianskyi (Ukrainian: Володимир Казимирович Добрянський, born 12 December 1966) is a Ukrainian scientist, archaeologist, historian, speleologist, and researcher of antiquities, fortifications and toponymy. He became a member of the Ukrainian Society for the Protection of Historical and Cultural Monuments in 1981, the Shevchenko Scientific Society in 2000, and the National Union of Journalists of Ukraine from 2016 to 2020. He also co-founded the NGO "Alternatyva-Chortkiv". He also participated in liquidating the Chornobyl accident of the second category.

Dobrianskyi comes from an ancient family of the Polish nobility with the Sas coat of arms.

== Biography ==
Dobrianskyi graduated from the Faculty of History of Yuri Fedkovych Chernivtsi State University in (1994), then worked as a history teacher in the Chortkiv Raion, and was secretary of the Historical and Educational Society "Memorial", a researcher at the Ternopil Oblast Museum, the Chortkiv centralized library system, and a senior researcher at the Chortkiv Municipal Museum of Local Lore.

From 1985 to 1987, Dobrianskyi served in the Ukrainian army. During his military service in the 3,238th military unit, he took part in the liquidation of the Chornobyl accident (from April–May 1986, and again from November 1986-January 1987).

== Research activities ==
Dobrianskyi has written over 100 scientific publications in professional journals, as well as many local lore and journalistic articles in the press.

Research and discoveries:

- Dobrianskyi has discovered over 100 archeological monuments in the territory of Zalishchyky, Borshchiv, Buchach, Chortkiv, Husiatyn and Terebovlia Raions;
- He located about 30 objects from defensive fortifications (settlements, castles, redoubts, lunettes) in Dobrovliany, Lysychnyky, Bedrykivtsi, Bila, Shmankivtsi, Shershenivka, Zvenyhorod, Yabluniv, Kotsiubyntsi;
- He has investigated about 50 previously unknown caves in Horodok, Zozulyntsi, Kasperivtsi, Chortkiv, Uhryn, Shmankivtsi and other settlements of the Ternopil Oblast.

Another area of activity is Dobrianskyi's study of ancient relics of ancient Slavic vocabulary, which are reflected in the toponymy of the region; on the basis of archaeological surveys of localities these can be used to reconstruct ancient oikonyms (settlements).

In 2019, at the 40-meter height of the tower of the Saint Stanislaus church in Chortkiv, archaeologist, researcher of fortifications and antiquities Volodymyr Dobrianskyi discovered a detonator of a shrapnel projectile, according to its flight trajectory determined that the 1st, 3rd, 4th and 7th cannon regiments (64 guns) under the command of Ataman Kyrylo Karas during the Chortkiv offensive (June 7–28, 1919) were stationed in the woods west of the village of Shmankivtsi in the Chortkiv Raion.

== Awards ==
- Petro Medvedyk Prize (2023) – for the study of archeological monuments in the territory of Zalishchyky, Borshchiv, Buchach, Chortkiv, Husiatyn and Terebovlia Raions.

== Bibliography ==
- Pohoretskyi, V. Unemployed archaeologist // Vilne zhyttia pius. - 2012. - No. 67 (August 31). - P. 5. - (Rogue in the native land?).
- Unemployed Chortkiv archaeologist // Zolota Pektoral. - 2013. - April 10.
- Both in word and in the experience of a historian and archaeologist // Voice of the People. - 2014. - No. 52 (December 12). - P. 12. - (Currently out of print).
- Dobryanskyi Volodymyr Kazymyrovych // Geologists and geographers of Ternopil region. - Ternopil: Osadtsa Yu.V., 2021. - 108—110 p.
- Gugushvili, T. Volodymyr Dobryanskyi: "Love for archeology and history is the meaning of my life" // Vilne zhyttia pius. - 2021. - No. 104 (December 29). - P. 4. - (Defender of Antiquities).
- Gugushvili, T. Volodymyr Dobryanskyi: "Love for archeology and history is the meaning of my life" // Vilne zhyttia. - 2022. - January 5.
- Hoshiy, I. Volodymyr Dobryansky: "Black diggers destroy the history of our region for their own enrichment" // Nova Ternopilska Hazeta. - 2022. - January 19.
