= Kyrnychky Cave =

Cave in Horodok, Ukraine

Kyrnychky
- Interactive map of Kyrnychky
- Location: Horodok, Zalishchyky urban hromada, Chortkiv Raion, Ternopil Oblast, Ukraine
- Coordinates: 48°38′12″N 25°51′27″E
- Discovery: 1890

Kyrnychky (Ukrainian: Кирнички) is a cave located in the Ukrainian village of Horodok, Zalishchyky urban hromada, Chortkiv Raion, Ternopil Oblast. It is located 700-800 meters northeast of the village (Kyrnychky tract). It belongs to the Nyzhnoseretska karst area.

== Place names ==
In the speleological cadastres, the cave is named as Budenna cave. Unfortunately, this name is not good, because geographical objects (which do not appear in local microtoponymy) should be named from the place names of the area where they are located or with reference to the geographical, natural and historical features on which they are located or associated with them.

== Description ==
The cave is laid in the thickness of sandy limestone, which lies more than 10 m deep. Its overlying rocks have a ground floor, and the underlying rocks are Devonian sandstones.

The cave is horizontal, two-story, erosive, corrosive and gravitational in genesis. It is located between rocks that have broken off and slid several meters along the ravine. The parent rock forms a 30-meter wide and 5-meter high grotto canopy up to 4 meters deep.

It has two tiers: the first is the Ossowski Passage, and the second is the Dobrianskyi Passage. Three springs flow from the cracks under the canopy. One of them is a waterfall that flows from an overhanging rock from a height of 1.5 meters. The sediments (fillers) of the cavity are clay and limestone fragments.

== History ==
The first exploration of the cave was conducted in 1890 by Polish archaeologist and geologist Gotfryd Ossowski.

The famous Galician ethnographer Bohdan Janusz and historian Aleksander Czołowski attributed the tract to medieval religious places, which in chronological terms date back to the seventeenth century.

In 1966, members of the Ternopil Regional Speleoclub "Podillia" under the leadership of V. Apostoliuk made a speleological description and mapping of the cave. The cave was re-mapped and described in 2005 by Petro Ploshchanskyi, and new additions to the plan were made by Volodymyr Dobrianskyi and Petro Ploshchanskyi in 2015.

In 1990, Volodymyr Dobrianskyi conducted an archaeological and speleological survey of the tract and the cave. He discovered antiquities of the Trypillian culture of the Eneolithic, Early Iron Age, and Roman periods. On the left side of the ravine, on the second tier, a new passage was discovered. Near the passage is a massive boulder that broke away from the solid rock. In its western corner, a forged human face was found, near which lapidary inscriptions in Cyrillic script and signs were studied in 2006. Several poorly preserved signs, which may relate to Turkic or Germanic runes or Sarmatian tamgas, were investigated on the left side of the waterfall in 2011. We also established the fact that a pagan sanctuary, later a Christian hermitage, may have functioned here.

In 1994, as part of the ecological expedition "Dnister" of the organization "Tovarystvo Leva", together with the Carpathian Expedition of the National Academy of Sciences of Ukraine and Ivan Franko National University of Lviv, the natural monument was explored by V. Artyukh, who laid a small pit in the cave (where Ossowski's Passage is located), in which he found an arrowhead for a bow and fragments of 14th-century ceramics.

The cave was used both for religious purposes and for defense and fortification purposes - it was a safe haven for local residents during times of military danger. In particular, during the World War II, the UPA base was located here.
