= Berestok, Ternopil Oblast =

Rural locality in Ternopil Oblast, Ukraine

Berestok Бересток
- Location in Ternopil Oblast
- Coordinates: 48°46′40″N 25°43′3″E
- Country: Ukraine
- Oblast: Ternopil Oblast
- Raion: Chortkiv Raion
- Hromada: Zalishchyky urban hromada
- Time zone: UTC+2 (EET)
  - Summer (DST): UTC+3 (EEST)
- Postal code: 48605

Berestok (Ukrainian: Бересток) is a village in Zalishchyky urban hromada, Chortkiv Raion, Ternopil Oblast, Ukraine.

== History ==
It was first mentioned in writings in 1806.

After the liquidation of the Zalishchyky Raion on 19 July 2020, the village became part of the Chortkiv Raion.

== Religion ==
- Holy Trinity church (1992, brick, UGCC).

== Sources ==
- (in Ukrainian) Гаврильцьо І., Бересток // Ternopil Encyclopedic Dictionary: in 4 v. / editorial board: H. Yavorskyi and other, Ternopil: "Zbruch", 2004, V. 1: А—Й, S. 114. — ISBN 966-528-197-6.
- "Berestek". Geographical Dictionary of the Kingdom of Poland (in Polish). 1. Warszawa: Kasa im. Józefa Mianowskiego. 1880. p. 140.
