= Duniv, Ternopil Oblast =

Rural locality in Ternopil Oblast, Ukraine

Duniv Дунів
- Location in Ternopil Oblast
- Coordinates: 48°38′29″N 25°53′32″E
- Country: Ukraine
- Oblast: Ternopil Oblast
- Raion: Chortkiv Raion
- Hromada: Zalishchyky urban hromada
- Time zone: UTC+2 (EET)
  - Summer (DST): UTC+3 (EEST)
- Postal code: 48661

Duniv (Ukrainian: Дунів) is a village in Zalishchyky urban hromada, Chortkiv Raion, Ternopil Oblast, Ukraine.

== History ==
It was first mentioned in writings in 1440.

After the liquidation of the Zalishchyky Raion on 19 July 2020, the village became part of the Chortkiv Raion.

== Religion ==
- Saint Josaphat's church (1994).

== Sources ==
- (in Ukrainian) Олійник В., Ониськів М., Дунів // Ternopil Encyclopedic Dictionary: in 4 v. / editorial board: H. Yavorskyi and other, Ternopil: "Zbruch", 2004, V. 1: А—Й, S. 546. — ISBN 966-528-197-6.
- "Duninów". Geographical Dictionary of the Kingdom of Poland (in Polish). 2. Warszawa: Kasa im. Józefa Mianowskiego. 1881. p. 227.
