= Yakubivka, Ternopil Oblast =

Rural locality in Ternopil Oblast, Ukraine

Yakubivka Якубівка
- Location in Ternopil Oblast
- Coordinates: 48°46′55″N 25°40′3″E
- Country: Ukraine
- Oblast: Ternopil Oblast
- Raion: Chortkiv Raion
- Hromada: Zalishchyky urban hromada
- Time zone: UTC+2 (EET)
  - Summer (DST): UTC+3 (EEST)
- Postal code: 48642

Yakubivka (Ukrainian: Якубівка) is a village in Zalishchyky urban hromada, Chortkiv Raion, Ternopil Oblast, Ukraine.

== History ==
It was first mentioned in writings in 1890.

After the liquidation of the Zalishchyky Raion on 19 July 2020, the village became part of the Chortkiv Raion.

== Religion ==
The village has a chapel (2002).

== Sources ==
- (in Ukrainian) Олійник В., Якубівка // Ternopil Encyclopedic Dictionary: in 4 v. / editorial board: H. Yavorskyi and other, Ternopil: "Zbruch", 2008, V. 3: П—Я, S. 685. — ISBN 978-966-528-279-2.
