= Vynohradne, Ternopil Oblast =

Rural locality in Ternopil Oblast, Ukraine

Vynohradne Виноградне
- Location in Ternopil Oblast
- Coordinates: 48°36′8″N 25°51′26″E
- Country: Ukraine
- Oblast: Ternopil Oblast
- Raion: Chortkiv Raion
- Hromada: Zalishchyky urban hromada
- Time zone: UTC+2 (EET)
  - Summer (DST): UTC+3 (EEST)
- Postal code: 48664

Vynohradne (Ukrainian: Виноградне; until 1964 Kostilnyky) is a village in Zalishchyky urban hromada, Chortkiv Raion, Ternopil Oblast, Ukraine.

== History ==
It was first mentioned in writings in 1556.

After the liquidation of the Zalishchyky Raion on 19 July 2020, the village became part of the Chortkiv Raion.

== Religion ==
- Two churches of the Intercession (1892, OCU; UGCC).

== Sources ==
- (in Ukrainian) Ternopil Encyclopedic Dictionary: in 4 v. / editorial board: H. Yavorskyi and other, Ternopil: "Zbruch", 2004, V. 1: А—Й, 696 s. — ISBN 966-528-197-6.
- "Kościelniki 2.) K., pow. zaleszczycki". Geographical Dictionary of the Kingdom of Poland (in Polish). 4. Warszawa: Kasa im. Józefa Mianowskiego. 1883. p. 455.
