= Stavky =

Stavky may refer to the following places in Ukraine:

- Stavky (river), a river in Chortkiv Raion, Ternopil Oblast
- Stavky, Chortkiv Raion, village in Zalishchyky urban hromada, Chortkiv Raion, Ternopil Oblast
- Stavky, Horlivka Raion, a village in Horlivka Raion, Donetsk Oblast
- Stavky, Skadovsk Raion, a village in Skadovsk Raion, Kherson Oblast
