= Dzvyniach, Ternopil Oblast =

Rural locality in Ternopil Oblast, Ukraine

Dzvyniach Дзвиняч
- Location in Ternopil Oblast
- Coordinates: 48°42′22″N 25°44′6″E
- Country: Ukraine
- Oblast: Ternopil Oblast
- Raion: Chortkiv Raion
- Hromada: Zalishchyky urban hromada
- Time zone: UTC+2 (EET)
  - Summer (DST): UTC+3 (EEST)
- Postal code: 48650

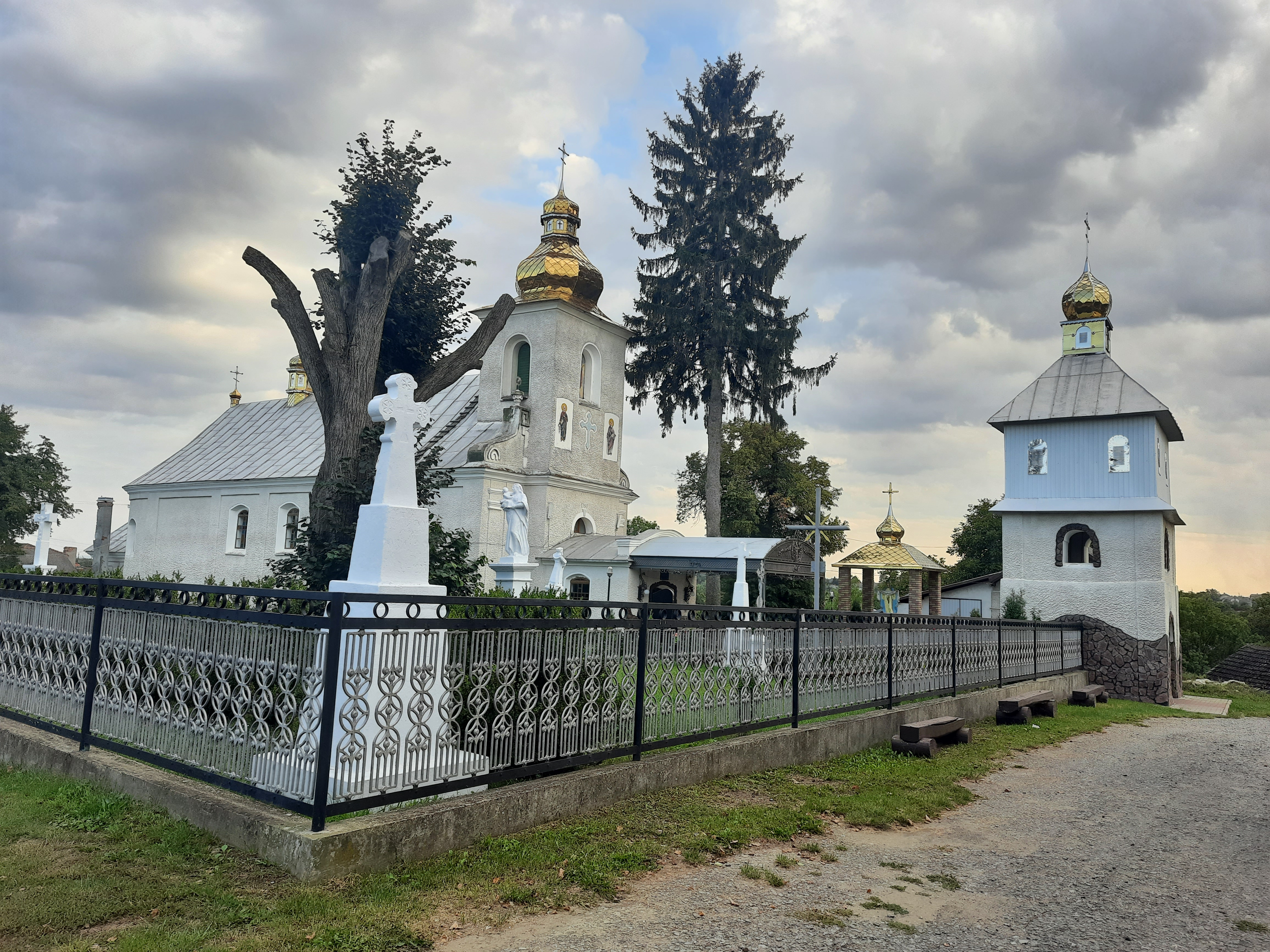
Church of the Assumption of the Blessed Virgin Mary (1791), Dzvinyach Chortkiv district, Ternopil

Dzvyniach (Ukrainian: Дзвиняч) is a village in Zalishchyky urban hromada, Chortkiv Raion, Ternopil Oblast, Ukraine.

== History ==
It was first mentioned in writings in 1517.

After the liquidation of the Zalishchyky Raion on 19 July 2020, the village became part of the Chortkiv Raion.

== Religion ==
- Church of the Assumption (1791, OCU),
- Chapel of Our Lady of the Angels (1871, RCC).

== Sources ==
- (in Ukrainian) Дубецький І., Олійник В., Умрихін П., Дзвиняч // Ternopil Encyclopedic Dictionary: in 4 v. / editorial board: H. Yavorskyi and other, Ternopil: "Zbruch", 2004, V. 1: А—Й, S. 489. — ISBN 966-528-197-6.
