= Torske =

Torske (Ukrainian: Торське) may refer to:

== Populated places ==
- Torske, Druzhkivka urban hromada, Kramatorsk Raion, Donetsk Oblast, a settlement in eastern Ukraine
- Torske, Lyman urban hromada, Kramatorsk Raion, Donetsk Oblast, eastern Ukraine
- Torske, Ternopil Oblast, a settlement in Chortkiv Raion, western Ukraine

== People ==
- Bjørn Torske (born 1971), Norwegian music producer
- Jarl Torske (born 1949), Norwegian footballer
- Tor Erik Torske (born 1983), Norwegian footballer
