= Horodok, Ternopil Oblast =

Village in Ternopil Oblast, Ukraine

Horodok Городок
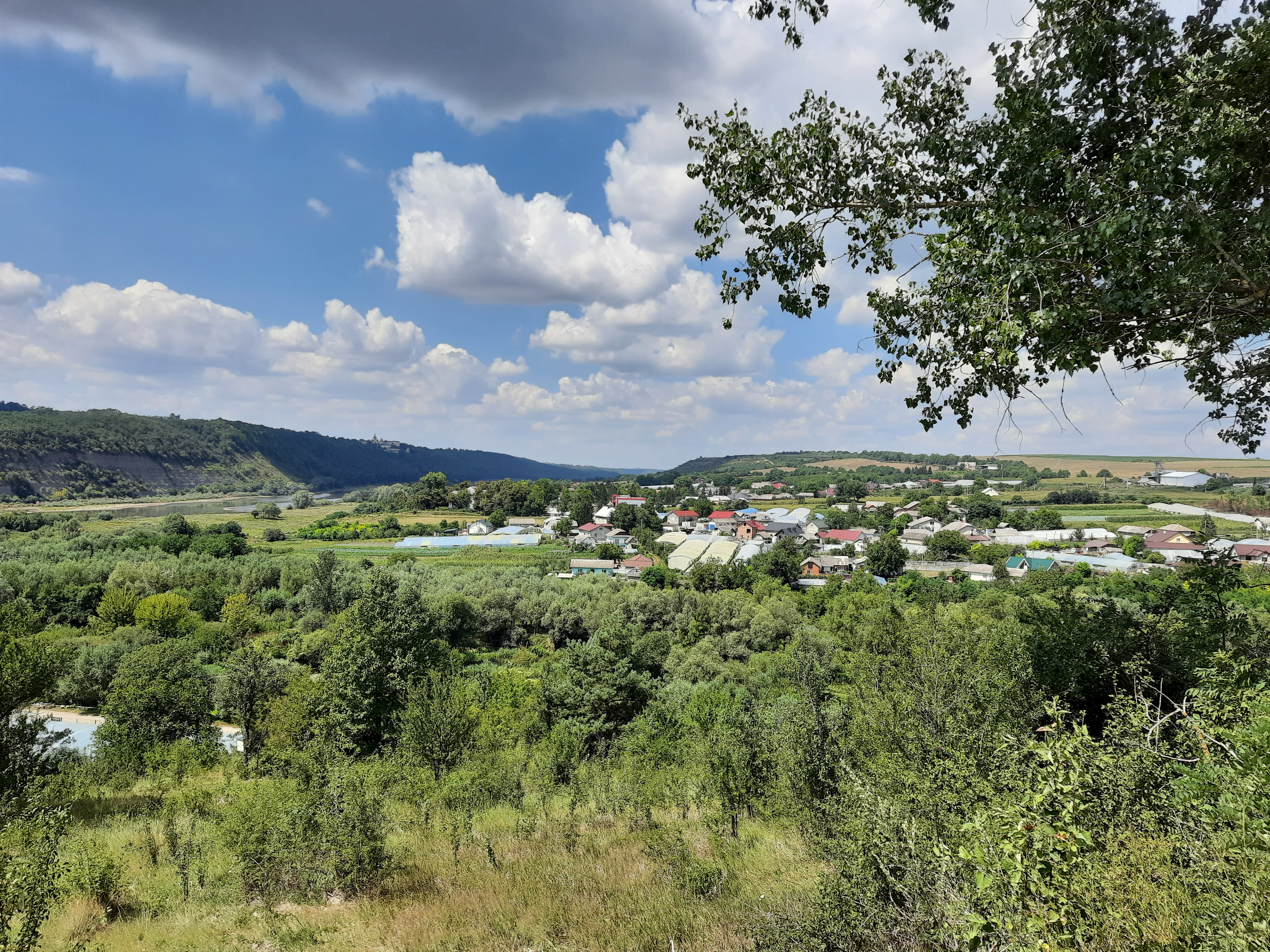
- Skyline of Horodok

- Coat of arms

- Location in Ternopil Oblast
- Coordinates: 48°37′45″N 25°51′23″E
- Country: Ukraine
- Oblast: Ternopil Oblast
- Raion: Chortkiv Raion
- Hromada: Zalishchyky Hromada
- Postal code: 48605

Horodok (Ukrainian: Городок) is a village in Zalishchyky urban hromada, Chortkiv Raion, Ternopil Oblast, Ukraine. It is located at the confluence of Seret and Dniester rivers.

== History ==
Settlements of Trypillian culture, as well as graves from Scythian and Kyivan Rus periods were discovered near the villageAs a result of archeological excavations were led by Adam Kirkor (1878), Gottfryd Ossowski (1890) and Tadeusz Sulimirski (1934).

The first written mention dates from 1418. During Soviet times the village belonged to Zalishchyky Raion.

== Monuments ==
- The lost Horodok Castle
- Kyrnychky Cave

== Religion ==
- Saint Michael's Church (with the miraculous image of the Virgin Mary, 1777)

== Notable residents ==
- Volodymyr Dobrianskyi (born 1966), Ukrainian scientist, archaeologist, historian, speleologist, and researcher of antiquities, fortifications and toponymy
- Leszek Dunin-Borkowski (1811–1896), Polish poet and translator
