= Horodok Castle, Ternopil Oblast =

Castle in Horodok, Ternopil Oblast, Ukraine

Horodok Castle
- Городоцький замок
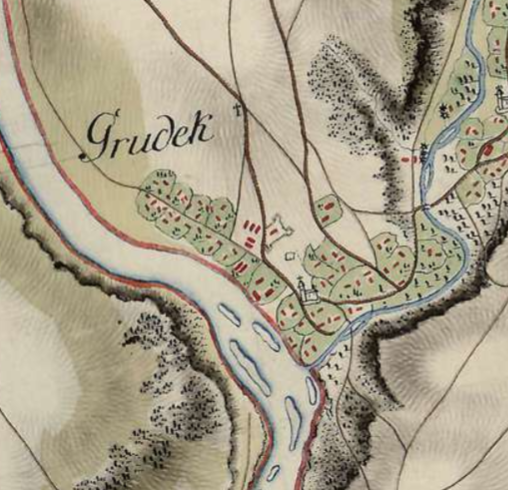
- The Horodok and castle on the map by Friedrich von Mieg, 19th century.

General information
- Location: Horodok, Chortkiv Raion, Ternopil Oblast
- Country: Ukraine
- Coordinates: 48°37′31″N 25°51′19″E

The Horodok Castle (Ukrainian: Городоцький замок, romanized: Horodots'kyi zamok) was a lost defensive structure in the village of Horodok of the Zalishchyky urban hromada in the Chortkiv Raion of Ternopil Oblast of Ukraine.

== History ==
There was a castle and city fortifications in the village of Horodok in the Chortkiv Raion. The village was first mentioned in 1453. At the beginning of the 15th century, the town already had fortifications. In 1600, a part of the crown army was stationed in the castle, which later went on the Wallachian campaign of Jan Zamoyski. The town with the castle and fortifications can be seen on the map of Guillaume Le Vasseur de Beauplan of the 17th century. The castle with four bastions is also marked on the map of Friedrich von Mieg. 1782 without a single destroyed bastion. The stronghold is also known as "Shantsi Panny Marii".

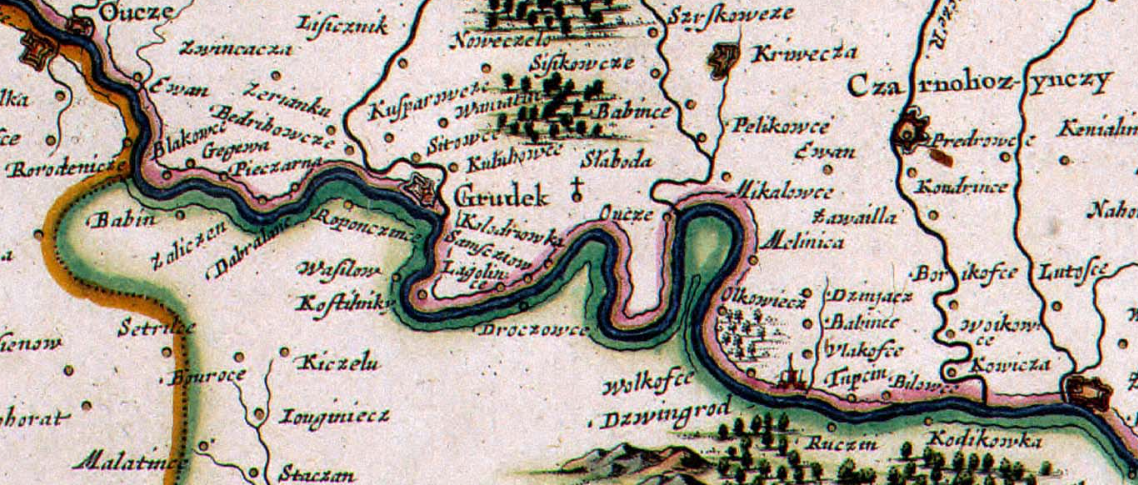
Horodok Castle on Guillaume de Beauplan's map, 17th century.
