= Pechorna =

Rural locality in Ternopil Oblast, Ukraine

Pechorna Печорна
- Location in Ternopil Oblast
- Coordinates: 48°40′12″N 25°40′35″E
- Country: Ukraine
- Oblast: Ternopil Oblast
- Raion: Chortkiv Raion
- Hromada: Zalishchyky urban hromada
- Time zone: UTC+2 (EET)
  - Summer (DST): UTC+3 (EEST)
- Postal code: 48605

Pechorna (Ukrainian: Печорна; Polish: Pieczarna) is a village in Zalishchyky urban hromada, Chortkiv Raion, Ternopil Oblast, Ukraine.

== History ==
It was first mentioned in writings in 1427.

After the liquidation of the Zalishchyky Raion on 19 July 2020, the village became part of the Chortkiv Raion.

== Religion ==
- St. Michael's church (1909, brick).

== Sources ==
- (in Ukrainian) Дубецький І., Печорна // Ternopil Encyclopedic Dictionary: in 4 v. / editorial board: H. Yavorskyi and other, Ternopil: "Zbruch", 2008, V. 3: П—Я, S. 62. — ISBN 978-966-528-279-2.
- "Pieczarna". Geographical Dictionary of the Kingdom of Poland (in Polish). 8. Warszawa: Kasa im. Józefa Mianowskiego. 1887. p. 72.
