= Duplyska =

Rural locality in Ternopil Oblast, Ukraine

Duplyska Дуплиська
- Location in Ternopil Oblast
- Coordinates: 48°43′16″N 25°46′32″E
- Country: Ukraine
- Oblast: Ternopil Oblast
- Raion: Chortkiv Raion
- Hromada: Zalishchyky urban hromada
- Time zone: UTC+2 (EET)
  - Summer (DST): UTC+3 (EEST)
- Postal code: 48605

Duplyska (Ukrainian: Дуплиська) is a village in Zalishchyky urban hromada, Chortkiv Raion, Ternopil Oblast, Ukraine.

== History ==
It was first mentioned in writings in 1578.

After the liquidation of the Zalishchyky Raion on 19 July 2020, the village became part of the Chortkiv Raion.

== Religion ==
- Church of the Nativity of the Blessed Virgin Mary (1896; brick, restored in 1989, UGCC),
- Roman Catholic Church (1889; brick).

== Famous people ==
- Yakiv Tymchuk (1919–1988), Ukrainian Greek Catholic clandestine hierarch

== Sources ==
- (in Ukrainian) , Дуплиська // Ternopil Encyclopedic Dictionary: in 4 v. / editorial board: H. Yavorskyi and other, Ternopil: "Zbruch", 2004, V. 1: А—Й, 696 s. — ISBN 966-528-197-6.
- "Dupliska". Geographical Dictionary of the Kingdom of Poland (in Polish). 2. Warszawa: Kasa im. Józefa Mianowskiego. 1881. p. 228.
