= Uhrynkivtsi =

Rural locality in Ternopil Oblast, Ukraine

Uhrynkivtsi Угриньківці
- Village
- Interactive map of Uhrynkivtsi
- Coordinates: 48°44′54″N 25°45′13″E
- Country: Ukraine
- Oblast: Ternopil Oblast
- District: Chortkiv Raion
- Established: 1442

Government
  - Head: Liubov Harvasiuk

Area
  - Total: 2.460 km^{2} (0.950 sq mi)

Population
  - Total: 642
  - Urban density: 260.98/km^{2} (675.9/sq mi)
- Time zone: UTC+2 (EET)
  - Summer (DST): UTC+3 (EEST)
- Postal code: 48643
- Area code: +380 3554

Uhrynkivtsi (Ukrainian: Угриньківці, Polish: Uhryńkowce) is a village located on the Tupa River in Chortkiv Raion of Ternopil Oblast in western Ukraine. Uhrynkivtsi is the administrative center of the village council, which also includes villages Berestok and Khartonivtsi. Before the imposed border changes following World War II, the village was located in eastern Poland. It belongs to Zalishchyky urban hromada, one of the hromadas of Ukraine.

The population of the village in 2007 was 641.

The Head of the Village Council is Liubov Harvasiuk.

Until 18 July 2020, Uhrynkivtsi belonged to Zalishchyky Raion. The raion was abolished in July 2020 as part of the administrative reform of Ukraine, which reduced the number of raions of Ternopil Oblast to three. The area of Zalishchyky Raion was merged into Chortkiv Raion.

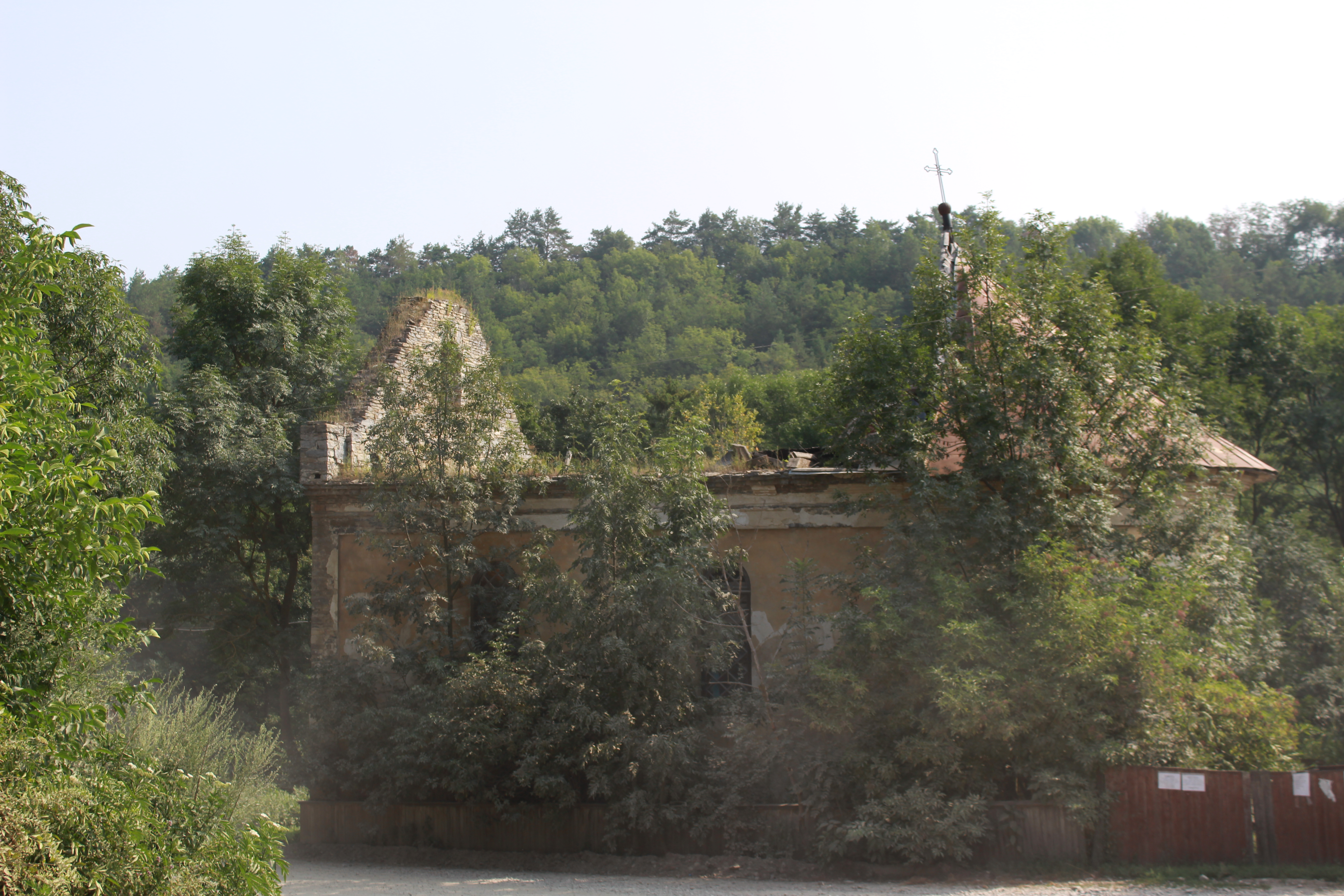
The ruins of a St. Hyacinthus Catholic chapel

== Notable residents ==
- Maurycy Rudzki, Polish geophysicist, born in Uhryńkowce in 1862
- Renia Spiegel (1924–1942), Polish diarist killed during the Holocaust, known as "Polish Anne Frank"

== Sources ==
- (in Ukrainian) М. Бігус, В. Олійник, Угриньківці // Ternopil Encyclopedic Dictionary: in 4 v. / editorial board: H. Yavorskyi and other, Ternopil: "Zbruch", 2008, V. 3: П—Я, S. 483. — ISBN 978-966-528-279-2.
