= Hlushka =

Rural locality in Ternopil Oblast, Ukraine

Hlushka Глушка
- Location in Ternopil Oblast
- Coordinates: 48°44′16″N 25°39′50″E
- Country: Ukraine
- Oblast: Ternopil Oblast
- Raion: Chortkiv Raion
- Hromada: Zalishchyky urban hromada
- Time zone: UTC+2 (EET)
  - Summer (DST): UTC+3 (EEST)
- Postal code: 48642

Hlushka (Ukrainian: Глушка) is a village in Zalishchyky urban hromada, Chortkiv Raion, Ternopil Oblast, Ukraine.

== History ==
It was first mentioned in writings in 1892.

After the liquidation of the Zalishchyky Raion on 19 July 2020, the village became part of the Chortkiv Raion.

== Religion ==
- Church of the Nativity of St. John the Baptist (1993, UGCC).

== Sources ==
- (in Ukrainian) Уніят В., Глушка // Ternopil Encyclopedic Dictionary: in 4 v. / editorial board: H. Yavorskyi and other, Ternopil: "Zbruch", 2004, V. 1: А—Й, S. 366. — ISBN 966-528-197-6.
- "o wsi w h. Torskie, pow. zaleszczycki". Geographical Dictionary of the Kingdom of Poland (in Polish). 12. Warszawa: Kasa im. Józefa Mianowskiego. 1892. p. 411.
