= Khartonivtsi =

Rural locality in Ternopil Oblast, Ukraine

Khartonivtsi Хартонівці
- Location in Ternopil Oblast
- Coordinates: 48°45′48″N 25°44′58″E
- Country: Ukraine
- Oblast: Ternopil Oblast
- Raion: Chortkiv Raion
- Hromada: Zalishchyky urban hromada
- Time zone: UTC+2 (EET)
  - Summer (DST): UTC+3 (EEST)
- Postal code: 48605

Khartonivtsi (Ukrainian: Хартонівці; Polish: Chartanowce) is a village in Zalishchyky urban hromada, Chortkiv Raion, Ternopil Oblast, Ukraine.

== History ==
It was first mentioned in writings in 1493.

After the liquidation of the Zalishchyky Raion on 19 July 2020, the village became part of the Chortkiv Raion.

== Religion ==
- Church of the Beheading of John the Baptist (19th century, brick).

== Sources ==
- (in Ukrainian) Ковальков Ю., Олійник В., Хартонівці // Ternopil Encyclopedic Dictionary: in 4 v. / editorial board: H. Yavorskyi and other, Ternopil: "Zbruch", 2008, V. 3: П—Я, S. 543. — ISBN 978-966-528-279-2.
- "Chartanowce". Geographical Dictionary of the Kingdom of Poland (in Polish). 1. Warszawa: Kasa im. Józefa Mianowskiego. 1880. p. 548.
