= Bedrykivtsi, Ternopil Oblast =

Rural locality in Ternopil Oblast, Ukraine

Bedrykivtsi Бедриківці
- Location in Ternopil Oblast
- Coordinates: 48°41′34″N 25°46′51″E
- Country: Ukraine
- Oblast: Ternopil Oblast
- Raion: Chortkiv Raion
- Hromada: Zalishchyky urban hromada
- Time zone: UTC+2 (EET)
  - Summer (DST): UTC+3 (EEST)
- Postal code: 48605

Bedrykivtsi (Ukrainian: Бедриківці; Polish: Bedrykowce) is a village in Zalishchyky urban hromada, Chortkiv Raion, Ternopil Oblast, Ukraine.

== History ==
It was first mentioned in writings in 1438.

After the liquidation of the Zalishchyky Raion on 19 July 2020, the village became part of the Chortkiv Raion.

== Religion ==
- Two churches of St. Michael (1833, brick, OCU; UGCC).

== Sources ==
- (in Ukrainian) Костинюк І., Уніят В., Бедриківці // Ternopil Encyclopedic Dictionary: in 4 v. / editorial board: H. Yavorskyi and other, Ternopil: "Zbruch", 2004, V. 1: А—Й, S. 95. — ISBN 966-528-197-6.
- "Bedrykowce nad Dupą". Geographical Dictionary of the Kingdom of Poland (in Polish). 1. Warszawa: Kasa im. Józefa Mianowskiego. 1880. p. 124.
