= Kasperivtsi =

Rural locality in Ternopil Oblast, Ukraine

Kasperivtsi Касперівці
- Village
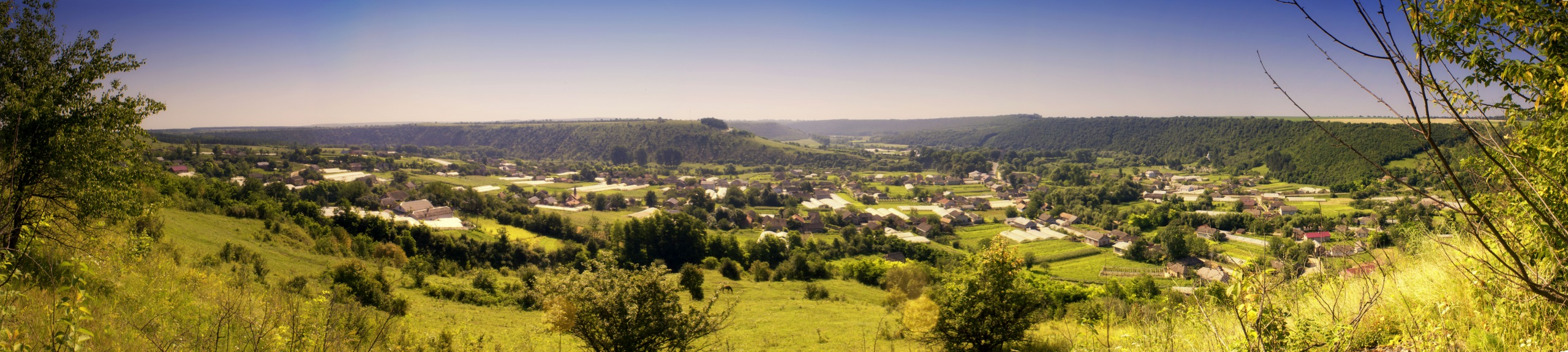

- Location in Ukraine
- Coordinates: 48°40′02″N 25°50′34″E
- Country: Ukraine
- Oblast: Ternopil Oblast
- District: Chortkiv Raion
- Established: 1469

Government
  - Head: Vladimir Halaydida

Area
  - Total: 4.250 km^{2} (1.641 sq mi)
- Elevation: 151 m (495 ft)

Population (2015)
  - Total: ▲1,100
  - Urban density: 272/km^{2} (700/sq mi)
- Time zone: UTC+2 (EET)
  - Summer (DST): UTC+3 (EEST)
- Postal code: 48653
- Area code: +380 3554
- Website: 1ua.com.ua/c29425 (in Ukrainian)

Kasperivtsi (Ukrainian: Касперівці, Polish: Kasperowce) is a village located on the Seret River in Chortkiv Raion of Ternopil Oblast (province), in western Ukraine. Kasperivtsi is the administrative center of the village council, which also includes the village of Lysychnyky. It belongs to Zalishchyky urban hromada, one of the hromadas of Ukraine.

In 2015, its estimated population was around 1100.

== History ==
At Kasperivtsi, archaeological attractions found include late-feudal period Roman coins.

The most famous of these antiquities, the so-called Mousterian Kasperivtsi monument – one of the most interesting objects of the Middle Paleolithic in Eastern Europe. It is widely known in the scientific literature. The cultural layer, located under a layer of loess deposits was partially eroded and redeposited back in the Pleistocene period, but despite this horizon was very rich in archaeological materials, particularly fossil fauna.

Cultural and historical place Kasperivtsi not fully defined until now, though sight is essential as a first stratified Mousterian settlements in mainland Ukraine.

The first written mention – 1469.

The geographical location of the Milky Way promoted economic development. 1619 King Sigismund III gave J. Lyutomyrskyy privilege to found in the village of Kasperivtsi "For Seret" the city that was called Lutomirsk. Frequent Turkish-Tatar attacks led to its decline.

From 1641 the town became Lutomirsk Kasperivtsi, and after 1786 lost the city status. It was also part of the short-lived Turkish Podolia Eyalet, which lasted from 1672 to 1699. During this period, it was nahiya centre in Yazlofça sanjak as Kaşperofça (Spelled as Kashperophcha in Turkish).

19th century. Kasperivtsi belonged Dunin-Borkowski graphs. 1905–1914 Mondays were bidding, selling cattle and pigs.

1914 in Kasperivtsi held rayonove holiday in honor of the 100th anniversary of Taras Shevchenko. Then, on the occasion of the 100th anniversary of Taras Shevchenko at the initiative of writer J. O. Makovey in the village main streets were named after Taras Shevchenko and Ivan Franko.

Before the war in the village. Kasperivtsi was p'yatyklasna school, after the war of 1919 – seven-year school in 1951 opened a secondary school, now secondary school degree. Acted in Kasperivtsi Society "Enlightenment", "Sich", "Meadow", "Union of Ukrainian", "Native school", "farmer", "Renaissance" cooperative.

25 December 1963 near the river Siret Kasperivtsi enacted HES.Since produced more than 600 million kvt.-hour. electricity. As a result, the state was established Kasperovskaya geological reserve area of 656 hectares, part of which is Kasperovskaya reservoir (263 hectares), currently Kasperivs'ka HPP – the most powerful hydroelectric plant in the Ternopil region. Today around Kasperovskaya GES – recreation area of the reservoir – a place of recreation and leisure.

7 May 1967 flood flooded part of the village, so called Horydolynu were casualties.

The village has ancient church "St. George" (17th century stone). "George Church" renamed "St. George", visited the Ukrainian Hetman Bohdan Khmelnytsky during the Turkish invasion. There he signed a treaty of armistice between Turkish and Ukrainian. 1972 built church "St. Paraskevia" (stone). The ruins of a Roman Catholic chapel (1910), limestone boulder Onuphrius (18th century). Chapel "Jesus Christ" was built in the center of the village Kasperivtsi (2000, stone) located at Kasperovskaya school chapel of Our Lady.

In 2006 the village was gas is installed. Gasification hosted the village head MV Zheliznyaka: gasified 400 houses.

Until 18 July 2020, Kasperivtsi belonged to Zalishchyky Raion. The raion was abolished in July 2020 as part of the administrative reform of Ukraine, which reduced the number of raions of Ternopil Oblast to three. The area of Zalishchyky Raion was merged into Chortkiv Raion.

== Archeology and monuments ==
- Church of St. George (17th c., Brick)
- Church of the Holy Paraskevia (1772, stone)
- The ruins of a Roman Catholic chapel (1910)
- Lime gouged boulder with a picture of St. Onuphrius (18th c.)

- Monument to fallen soldiers (1967)
- T. Shevchenko (1991, sculptor S. Brodovyy), memorial cross in honor of the abolition of serfdom and the independence of Ukraine (1994)
