= Holihrady =

Rural locality in Ternopil Oblast, Ukraine

Holihrady Голігради
- Location in Ternopil Oblast
- Coordinates: 48°42′25″N 25°51′1″E
- Country: Ukraine
- Oblast: Ternopil Oblast
- Raion: Chortkiv Raion
- Hromada: Zalishchyky urban hromada
- Time zone: UTC+2 (EET)
  - Summer (DST): UTC+3 (EEST)
- Postal code: 48660

Holihrady (Ukrainian: Голігради) is a village in Zalishchyky urban hromada, Chortkiv Raion, Ternopil Oblast, Ukraine.

== History ==
Archaeological sites of the Upper Paleolithic, Trypillian, Gava-Holigrady, Lipitsa, Chernyakhov, and Old Rus' cultures were discovered in the Vyhushiv tract near Holihrady. This village gave its name to the archaeological Holihrady culture (10th-7th centuries BC).

It was first mentioned in writings in 1530.

After the liquidation of the Zalishchyky Raion on 19 July 2020, the village became part of the Chortkiv Raion.

== Religion ==
- Two churches of St. Michael (1849; brick; 1996).

== Sources ==
- (in Ukrainian) Олійник В., Тимофійчук Я., Уніят В., Голігради // Ternopil Encyclopedic Dictionary: in 4 v. / editorial board: H. Yavorskyi and other, Ternopil: "Zbruch", 2004, V. 1: А—Й, S. 379. — ISBN 966-528-197-6.
- "Holihrady". Geographical Dictionary of the Kingdom of Poland (in Polish). 3. Warszawa: Kasa im. Józefa Mianowskiego. 1882. p. 101.
