= Abraham Stupp =

Israeli politician (1897–1968)

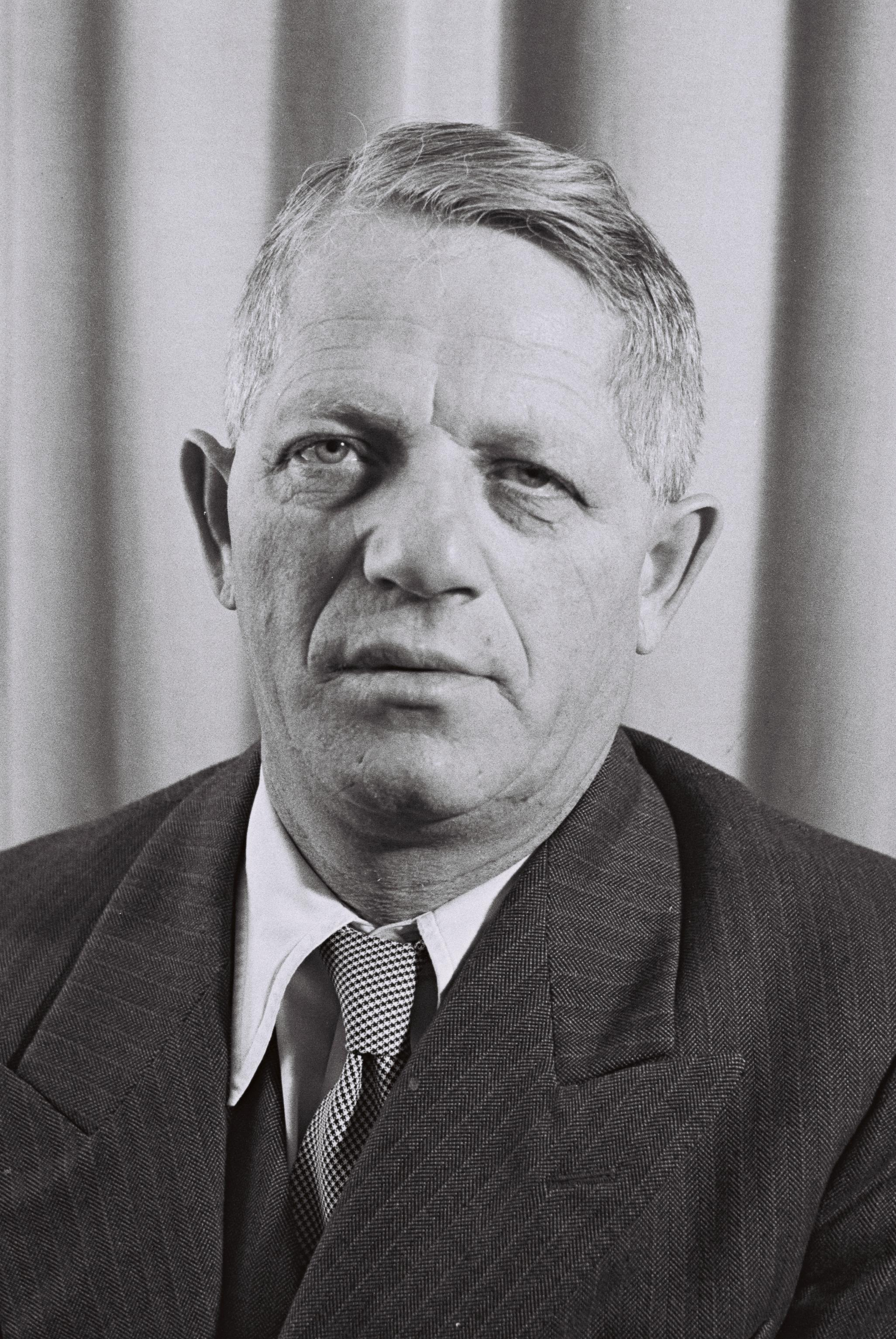
- Stupp in 1951

Faction represented in the Knesset
- 1951–1955: General Zionists

Personal details
- Born: 1897 Tłuste, Austria-Hungary
- Died: 26 September 1968 (aged 70–71)

Abraham Stupp (Hebrew: אברהם סטופ; 1897 – 26 September 1968) was an Israeli politician who served as a member of the Knesset for the General Zionists between 1951 and 1955.

== Biography ==
Born in Tłuste, a shtetl in Galicia in Austria-Hungary (today in Ukraine), Stupp was educated at a yeshiva before attending a gymnasium in Lviv. At Lviv University, he studied history and philosophy, earning a PhD in 1932. Whilst a student he became active in Zionist movements, and was one of the founders of the Ahva youth movement in Galicia. He also chaired the Polish branch of HeHalutz, and was general secretary of the Zionist Federation in East Galicia.

Having joined the General Zionists, he became a member of the organisation's world and national directorates. In 1935, he was elected to the executive committee of the Zionist Federation, and was also a member of the presidium of the Zionist Executive Committee for several years.

In 1939 he emigrated to Mandatory Palestine. Upon independence in 1948 he was an alternate member of the Provisional State Council. He was elected to the Knesset on the General Zionists' list in 1951, but lost his seat in the 1955 elections. He died in 1968.
