= Zozulyntsi, Ternopil Oblast =

Rural locality in Ternopil Oblast, Ukraine

Zozulyntsi Зозулинці
- Location in Ternopil Oblast
- Coordinates: 48°35′37″N 25°55′18″E
- Country: Ukraine
- Oblast: Ternopil Oblast
- Raion: Chortkiv Raion
- Hromada: Zalishchyky urban hromada
- Time zone: UTC+2 (EET)
  - Summer (DST): UTC+3 (EEST)
- Postal code: 48664

Zozulyntsi (Ukrainian: Зозулинці) is a village in Zalishchyky urban hromada, Chortkiv Raion, Ternopil Oblast, Ukraine.

== History ==
It was first mentioned in writings in 1532.

After the liquidation of the Zalishchyky Raion on 19 July 2020, the village became part of the Chortkiv Raion.

== Religion ==
- Two churches of the Assumption (1910, brick, OCU; 2008, brick, UGCC),
- Chapel of the Mother of God (1889, restored in 1992),
- Roman Catholic chapel (1892).

== Sources ==
- (in Ukrainian) Бігус М., Уніят В., Зозулинці // Ternopil Encyclopedic Dictionary: in 4 v. / editorial board: H. Yavorskyi and other, Ternopil: "Zbruch", 2004, V. 1: А—Й, S. 656. — ISBN 966-528-197-6.
- "Zazulińce, pow. zaleszczycki". Geographical Dictionary of the Kingdom of Poland (in Polish). 14. Warszawa: Kasa im. Józefa Mianowskiego. 1895. p. 505.
