= Saint George Church, Kasperivtsi =

Ukrainian Orthodox church in Kasperivtsi, Ukraine

Saint George church
- Георгіївська церква
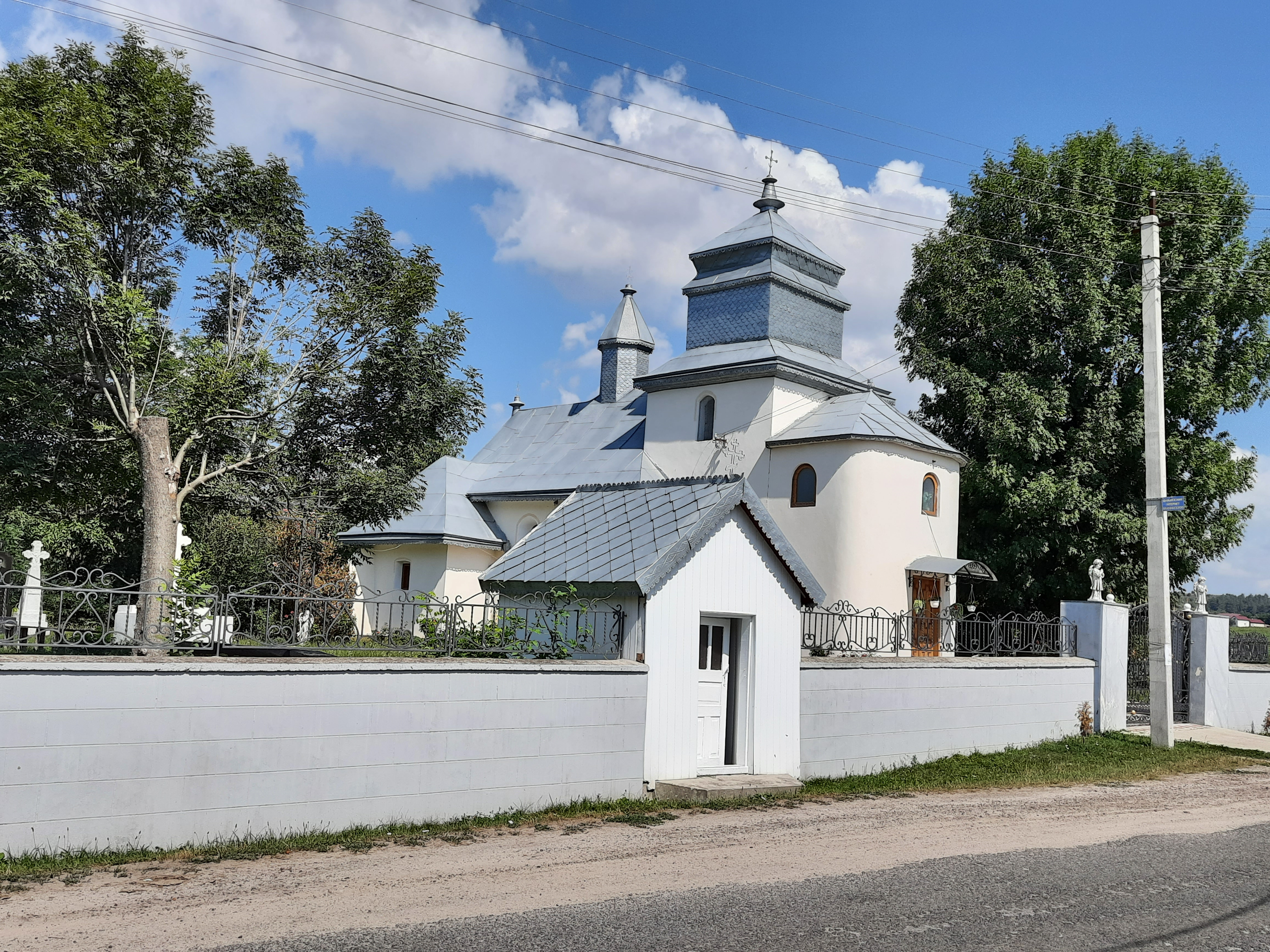

- Location within Ternopil Oblast

Religion
- Affiliation: Orthodox Church of Ukraine

Location
- Location: Kasperivtsi
- Coordinates: 48°39′42.8″N 25°50′43.2″E

Architecture
- Completed: 1619–1650

Immovable Monument of National Significance of Ukraine
- Official name: Георгіївська церква (мур.) (St George's Church (stone))
- Type: Architecture
- Reference no.: 190095

Saint George church (Ukrainian: Георгіївська церква) is a fortified church (OCU) located in Kasperivtsi in Chortkiv Raion, Ternopil Oblast, Ukraine. It is an architectural monument of national significance.

== History ==
The church was built between 1619 and 1650. It features a stone altar dating back to 1650, as indicated by an inscription on an inserted slab. During the Soviet era, the church was converted into a museum.

== Architecture ==
The structure is a stone monument of defensive architecture. Above the narthex, there used to be a two-tiered defensive tower, of which only the lower tier has survived to this day, crowned on the outside with a decorative square. The apse, complemented by a low extension, is reinforced with three buttresses. The building has a gable roof.

The narthex has no windows and is connected to the nave by a high arch in the interior. The original interior ceilings have been lost and replaced with wooden segmental vaults in both the nave and the apse.

The latest renovation led to the replacement of the authentic shingle roof with a tin one, which significantly distorted the appearance of the monument.

== Priests ==
- Volodymyr Pietsukh (from March 1992).
