= Torske, Ternopil Oblast =

Rural locality in Ternopil Oblast, Ukraine

Torske Торське
- Location in Ternopil Oblast
- Coordinates: 48°45′49″N 25°40′57″E
- Country: Ukraine
- Oblast: Ternopil Oblast
- Raion: Chortkiv Raion
- Hromada: Zalishchyky urban hromada
- Time zone: UTC+2 (EET)
  - Summer (DST): UTC+3 (EEST)
- Postal code: 48642

Torske (Ukrainian: Торське) is a village in Zalishchyky urban hromada, Chortkiv Raion, Ternopil Oblast, Ukraine.

== History ==
It was first mentioned in writings in 1440.

After the liquidation of the Zalishchyky Raion on 19 July 2020, the village became part of the Chortkiv Raion.

== Religion ==
- Church of the Annunciation (1843, brick),
- Wooden church (1706, not preserved); on this site now stands a cross and a Roman Catholic chapel (late 19th century, destroyed after the German-Soviet war).

== Sources ==
- (in Ukrainian) Дейкало М., Мельничук Б., Торське // Ternopil Encyclopedic Dictionary: in 4 v. / editorial board: H. Yavorskyi and other, Ternopil: "Zbruch", 2008, V. 3: П—Я, S. 462. — ISBN 978-966-528-279-2.
- "Torskie". Geographical Dictionary of the Kingdom of Poland (in Polish). 12. Warszawa: Kasa im. Józefa Mianowskiego. 1892. p. 411.
