= Renia Spiegel =

Jewish diarist (1924–1942)

- Born: Renia Spiegel; 18 June 1924; Uhryńkowce, Poland (now Ukraine)
- Died: 30 July 1942 (aged 18); Przemyśl, Poland
- Occupation: Diarist
- Relatives: Bernard Spiegel (father); Róża Maria Leszczyńska (mother); Elizabeth (née Ariana) Bellak (sister)
- Writing career
- Language: Polish

Renia Spiegel (18 June 1924 – 30 July 1942) was a Jewish-Polish diarist who was killed during World War II in the Holocaust.

Spiegel's diary, kept between the ages of 15 and 18, documents her experience as a teenager living in the city of Przemyśl through World War II as conditions for Jews deteriorated. Spiegel wrote about ordinary topics such as school, friendships, and romance, as well as about her fear of the growing war and about being forced to move into the Przemyśl ghetto. As a diary about the Holocaust, it is unique in that it chronicles experiences under both Soviet and Nazi rule.

Though it was in the possession of Spiegel's family for decades, the diary was not read by others until 2012 and was first published in English in 2019.

== Life ==
Renia Spiegel was born on 18 June 1924 in Uhryńkowce, then in Poland and now in western Ukraine, to Polish-Jewish parents Bernard Spiegel and Róża Maria Leszczyńska. She grew up on her father's large estate on the Dniester River near the border between Poland and Romania, along with a sister six years younger than her, Ariana (now Elizabeth Bellak), who was a child film star in Poland.

In 1938, Spiegel's mother sent her to live with her grandparents in the town of Przemyśl, Poland, while she herself moved to Warsaw to promote Ariana's acting career. Ariana was sent to join Spiegel in Przemyśl during the summer of 1938. Spiegel's grandmother owned a stationery store and her grandfather was a construction contractor. In August 1939, the Molotov–Ribbentrop Pact and the subsequent Nazi invasion of Poland made it impossible for the two girls and their mother to reach each other. Spiegel's father, Bernard, had stayed on the family estate and subsequently disappeared during the ensuing war. Separated from their parents, Ariana later said that Spiegel "was like a mother to me." As the war continued on, Spiegel attended school and socialized in Przemyśl, and in 1940 began to develop a romantic relationship with Zygmunt Schwarzer, the son of a prominent Jewish physician who was two years older than she. Spiegel referred to Schwarzer with the nickname "Zygu".

When the Przemyśl ghetto was established July 1942, Spiegel moved in along with 24,000 other Jews. After about two weeks, Schwarzer, who worked with the local resistance, secretly removed Spiegel from the ghetto and hid her and his own parents in the attic of his uncle's house because they had not received the work permits they would need in order to avoid deportation to concentration camps. An unknown informant told Nazi police about the hiding place, who executed the eighteen-year-old Spiegel along with Schwarzer's parents in the street on July 30, 1942.

Spiegel's mother, sister, and Schwarzer all survived the war and emigrated to the United States.

== Diary and publication ==
=== History of the diary ===
Spiegel began to keep her diary on January 31, 1939, when she was fifteen years old. The nearly 700-page diary was mostly kept in secret, and was made of seven school exercise books sewn together. The diary largely discusses Spiegel's everyday school, social, and family life in Przemyśl, touching in particular on her distress at being separated from her mother, her romantic relationship with Zygmunt Schwarzer, fear around the growing war, and the terror of moving into the ghetto. In addition to handwritten entries, the diary contains drawings and original poems. In her final entry on July 25, 1942, Spiegel wrote:

My dear diary, my good, beloved friend! We’ve gone through such terrible times together and now the worst moment is upon us. I could be afraid now. But the One who didn’t leave us then will help us today too. He’ll save us. Hear, O, Israel, save us, help us. You’ve kept me safe from bullets and bombs, from grenades. Help me survive! And you, my dear mamma, pray for us today, pray hard. Think about us and may your thoughts be blessed.

At the end of July, Schwarzer took possession of the diary and wrote the final entries about hiding Spiegel outside the ghetto and about her death: "Three shots! Three lives lost! All I can hear are shots, shots." Schwarzer left the diary with someone else before he was subsequently sent to the Auschwitz concentration camp. After surviving the camp, Schwarzer brought the diary to the United States and gave it to Spiegel's mother in 1950. Spiegel's sister Elizabeth (née Ariana) Bellak came into possession of the diary in 1969 and stored it in a bank vault until 2012.

=== Publication and adaptations ===
Though it was in the possession of Spiegel's family for decades, the diary was not read by others until 2012, when Bellak's daughter, Alexandra Renata Bellak, a Manhattan realtor, had it translated to English for the first time by Anna Blasiak and Marta Dziurosz. The diary was published in Polish in 2016 and has since inspired a Polish stage play. Excerpts were first published in English in Smithsonian magazine in 2018. The first full 90,000-word English publication is titled Renia’s Diary: A Young Girl’s Life in the Shadow of the Holocaust, published in the United Kingdom on September 19, 2019, by Ebury Publishing, and distributed by Penguin Books. In the United States, it is titled Renia's Diary: A Holocaust Journal, and was published by St. Martin's Press and distributed by Macmillan Publishers on September 24, 2019. The publication contains a prologue and epilogue by Elizabeth Bellak. This edition was published in Spanish by Plaza & Janés on December 17, 2019.

The diary is also the subject of a documentary film directed by Tomasz Magierski titled Broken Dreams. The film premiered at the United Nations in New York City as part of its Holocaust remembrance program. The film opened at a Polish cinema on September 18, 2019.

In 2022, the story of Renia Spiegel formed part of the stage production WITNESSES, which tells the stories of five Jewish diarists during the Holocaust. The production debuted in Escondido, California and was based on a book by dramatist Robert L. Freedman.

=== Reception ===
Journalists have compared and contrasted Spiegel's diary with that of Anne Frank, with Robin Shulman of Smithsonian noting that "Renia was a little older and more sophisticated ... She was also living out in the world instead of in seclusion." Also writing for Smithsonian, Brigit Katz said that both Frank and Spiegel were "lucid writers, articulate and insightful in spite of their young age." Writing for The New York Times, Joanna Berendt said, "At a moment when basic agreement over simple truths has become a political battleground and history a weapon, the publication of the book, 'Renia’s Diary,' offers a reminder of the power of bearing witness."

== See also ==
- List of posthumous publications of Holocaust victims
- List of Holocaust diarists
- List of Poles
- List of victims of Nazism
