= Vyniatyntsi =

Rural locality in Ternopil Oblast, Ukraine

Vyniatyntsi Винятинці
- Location in Ternopil Oblast
- Coordinates: 48°41′5″N 25°53′34″E
- Country: Ukraine
- Oblast: Ternopil Oblast
- Raion: Chortkiv Raion
- Hromada: Zalishchyky urban hromada
- Time zone: UTC+2 (EET)
  - Summer (DST): UTC+3 (EEST)
- Postal code: 48660

Vyniatyntsi (Ukrainian: Винятинці) is a village in Zalishchyky urban hromada, Chortkiv Raion, Ternopil Oblast, Ukraine.

== History ==
It was first mentioned in writings in 1566.

After the liquidation of the Zalishchyky Raion on 19 July 2020, the village became part of the Chortkiv Raion.

== Religion ==
- Church of the Assumption (1826, OCU),
- the ruins of the Roman Catholic Church of Our Lady of Perpetual Help (1930),
- the chapel of the Position of the Robe of the Blessed Virgin Mary (1896; granted a 7-year vacation by Pope Pius IX and a permanent vacation by Pope Leo VIII).

== Sources ==
- (in Ukrainian) Олійник В., Тимофійчук Я., Винятинці // Ternopil Encyclopedic Dictionary: in 4 v. / editorial board: H. Yavorskyi and other, Ternopil: "Zbruch", 2004, V. 1: А—Й, S. 260. — ISBN 966-528-197-6.
- "Winiatyńce". Geographical Dictionary of the Kingdom of Poland (in Polish). 13. Warszawa: Kasa im. Józefa Mianowskiego. 1893. p. 549.
