= Zelenyi Hai, Ternopil Oblast =

Rural locality in Ternopil Oblast, Ukraine

Coordinates: 48°40′43″N 25°39′32″E

Zelenyi Hai (Ukrainian: Зелений Гай) is a village in Chortkiv Raion, Ternopil Oblast, Ukraine. It was named Zhezhava (Ukrainian: Жежава) until 1950. Zelenyi Hai belongs to Zalishchyky urban hromada, one of the hromadas of Ukraine.

Until 18 July 2020, Zelenyi Hai belonged to Zalishchyky Raion. The raion was abolished in July 2020 as part of the administrative reform of Ukraine, which reduced the number of raions of Ternopil Oblast to three. The area of Zalishchyky Raion was merged into Chortkiv Raion.

== Notable people ==
Notable people that were born or lived in Zelenyi Hai include:

- Emil Korytko (1813–1839), ethnographer and poet
