= Kulakivtsi =

Rural locality in Ternopil Oblast, Ukraine

Kulakivtsi Кулаківці
- Location in Ternopil Oblast
- Coordinates: 48°38′18″N 25°52′26″E
- Country: Ukraine
- Oblast: Ternopil Oblast
- Raion: Chortkiv Raion
- Hromada: Zalishchyky urban hromada
- Time zone: UTC+2 (EET)
  - Summer (DST): UTC+3 (EEST)
- Postal code: 48605

Kulakivtsi (Ukrainian: Кулаківці) is a village in Zalishchyky urban hromada, Chortkiv Raion, Ternopil Oblast, Ukraine.

== History ==
It was first mentioned in writings in 1610.

After the liquidation of the Zalishchyky Raion on 19 July 2020, the village became part of the Chortkiv Raion.

== Religion ==
- wooden church of St. Demetrius and bell tower (1862),
- ruins of the Roman Catholic church (1914).

== Sources ==
- (in Ukrainian) Мельничук Б., Олійник В., Кулаківці // Ternopil Encyclopedic Dictionary: in 4 v. / editorial board: H. Yavorskyi and other, Ternopil: "Zbruch", 2005, V. 2: К—О, S. 272. — ISBN 966-528-199-2.
- "Kułakowce (pow.zaleszczycki)". Geographical Dictionary of the Kingdom of Poland (in Polish). 4. Warszawa: Kasa im. Józefa Mianowskiego. 1883. p. 869.
