= Kolodribka =

Rural locality in Ternopil Oblast, Ukraine

Kolodribka Колодрібка
- Location in Ternopil Oblast
- Coordinates: 48°37′55″N 26°1′0″E
- Country: Ukraine
- Oblast: Ternopil Oblast
- Raion: Chortkiv Raion
- Hromada: Zalishchyky urban hromada
- Time zone: UTC+2 (EET)
  - Summer (DST): UTC+3 (EEST)
- Postal code: 48662

Kolodribka (Ukrainian: Колодрібка) is a village in Zalishchyky urban hromada, Chortkiv Raion, Ternopil Oblast, Ukraine.

== History ==
It was first mentioned in writings in 1446.

After the liquidation of the Zalishchyky Raion on 19 July 2020, the village became part of the Chortkiv Raion.

== Religion ==
- Church of the Assumption (1906),
- Roman Catholic chapel (1910).

== Sources ==
- "{{{3}}}". Geographical Dictionary of the Kingdom of Poland (in Polish). 4. Warszawa: Kasa im. Józefa Mianowskiego. 1883. p. 279.
