= Broken Dreams (2019 film) =

2019 Polish documentary film

- Theatrical release poster
- Directed by: Tomasz Magierski
- Written by: Tomasz Magierski
- Produced by: Tomasz Magierski
- Starring: Elizabeth Bellak; Aleksandra Bernatek
- Cinematography: Maciej Magowski
- Music by: Guy Gross
- Distributed by: Smoking Mirror Productions
- Release date: December 6, 2019 (United States)
- Running time: 70 minutes
- Countries: United States; Poland
- Languages: English and Polish

Broken Dreams is a 2019 Polish documentary film directed by Tomasz Magierski that tells the story of Renia and Ariana Spiegel, sisters who experienced the Holocaust as children in Poland. The film was prompted by the 2012 discovery of Renia Spiegel's diary, which she kept from 1939 until her death at the age of 18 in 1942. Broken Dreams premiered on May 2, 2019, at the United Nations in New York, and on September 18, 2019, in Warsaw, Poland.

== Synopsis ==
The documentary revolves around the diary of Renia Spiegel, who spent the early years of World War II in the Polish city of Przemyśl, along with her sister, Ariana Spiegel (now Elizabeth Bellak). Ariana was a child film star in Poland, while Renia was more reserved, a typical Polish youth. In her diary, Spiegel writes about everyday teenage life, as well as the growing war, eventually covering her imprisonment in the Przemyśl ghetto. After escaping the ghetto, Spiegel was killed at the age of 18 by Nazi police when her hiding place was discovered. Spiegel's diary was preserved by her boyfriend, Zygmunt Schwarzer, who eventually brought it to Spiegel's mother and sister in New York after the war. The diary remained unread until 2012, when Elizabeth Bellak's daughter had it translated to English, leading to its publication in 2019 and the creation of Broken Dreams. Broken Dreams tells the story of the Spiegel sisters through interviews with Bellak and readings of Renia's diary by Polish actress Aleksandra Bernatek. In addition to telling Renia's story, the documentary also spends substantial time telling Bellak's story of being a child actress.

== Production and release ==
After Elizabeth Bellak's daughter, Alexandra Renata Bellak, rediscovered Spiegel's diary in 2012, she approached Polish filmmaker Tomasz Magierski. After reading the diary, Magierski agreed to make a film, telling Agence France-Presse, "But I couldn’t stop reading it! I read this thing over probably four or five nights... I got used to her handwriting and to be honest I fell in love with her. I fell in love with Renia."

Broken Dreams premiered at the United Nations in New York on May 2, 2019, which was Yom HaShoah (Holocaust Remembrance Day). This screening was conducted by the Department of Global Communications and the Permanent Mission of Poland to the United Nations. The documentary's Polish premier took place in Warsaw on September 18, 2019.

== Reception ==
Writing for the Los Angeles Times, critic Gary Goldstein called Broken Dreams "vital and intriguing" but said that the production is "a bit cursory and cobbled together". Frank Scheck of The Hollywood Reporter wrote that the documentary is "deeply moving" and that it is one of the most powerful films providing a first-hand account of the Holocaust. He also praised Aleksandra Bernatek, who reads from Spiegel's diary, saying that she "delivers emotive readings that fully convey Renia's girlishness, passion and inner strength".
