= Tovste, Ternopil Oblast =

Rural locality in Ternopil Oblast, Ukraine

Tovste Товсте
- Rural settlement
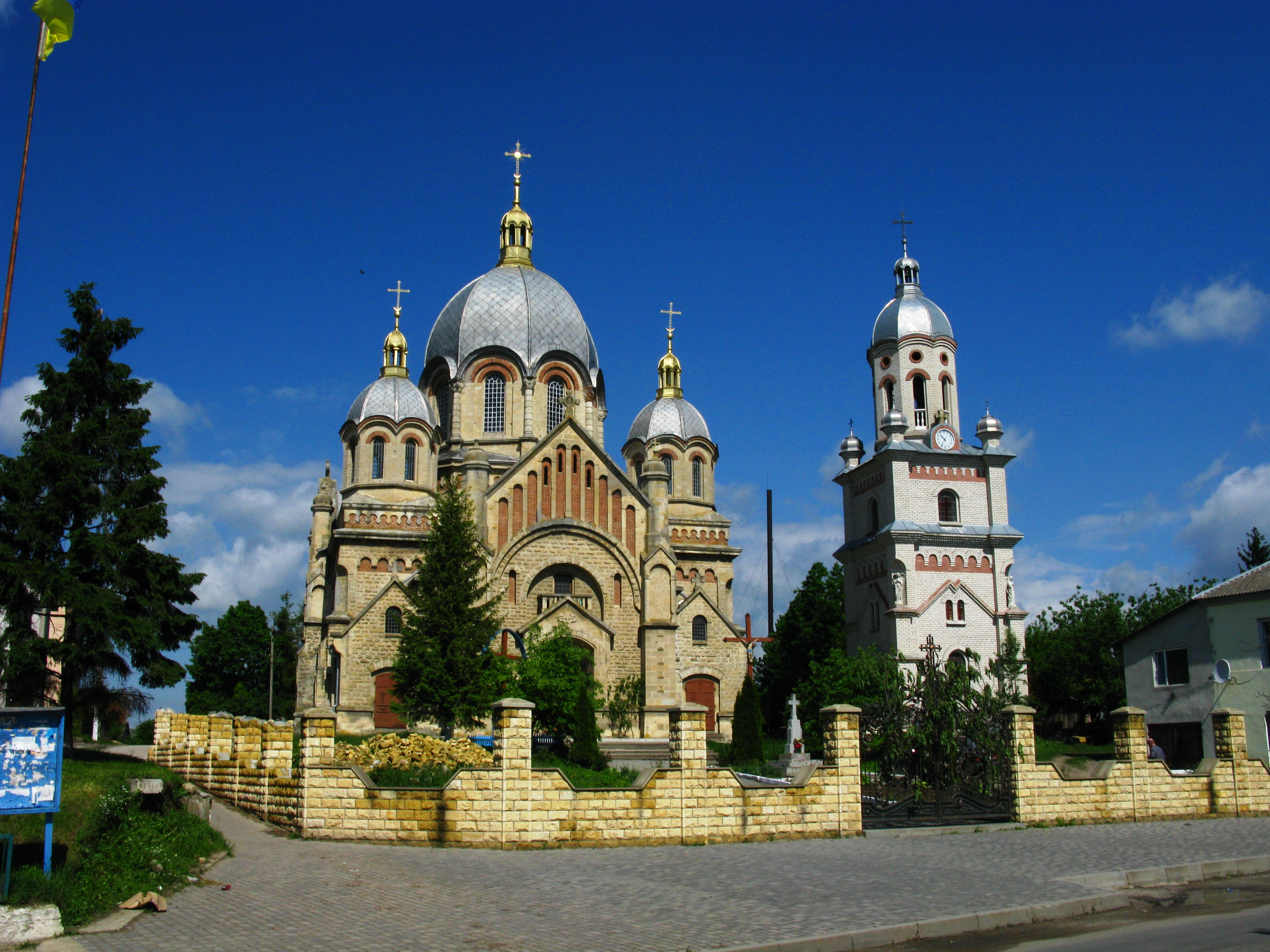

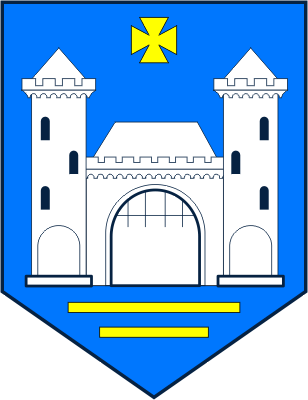
- Coat of arms

- Location of Tovste in Ternopil Oblast Location of Tovste in Ukraine
- Coordinates: 48°50′47″N 25°43′31″E
- Country: Ukraine
- Oblast: Ternopil Oblast
- Raion: Chortkiv Raion
- Founded: 1414
- Town status: 1944

Government
  - Town Head: Liubomyr Drants

Area
  - Total: 17 km^{2} (6.6 sq mi)
- Elevation: 282 m (925 ft)

Population (2022)
  - Total: 3,156
  - Density: 190/km^{2} (480/sq mi)
- Time zone: UTC+2 (EET)
  - Summer (DST): UTC+3 (EEST)
- Postal code: 48630
- Area code: +380 3554
- Website: http://rada.gov.ua/

Tovste (Ukrainian: Товсте, romanized: Tovste; Polish: Tłuste; Yiddish: טויסט/טלוסטאַ, romanized: Tlusta/Toyst; Hebrew: טלוסטה, romanized: Tluste) is a rural settlement in Chortkiv Raion, Ternopil Oblast, western Ukraine. The town is located on the Ternopil—Chernivtsi automobile road in the historic region of Podolia, on the banks of the Tupa River, a tributary of the Seret. It hosts the administration of Tovste settlement hromada, one of the hromadas of Ukraine. Population: 3,156 (2022 estimate).

== History ==
Historians date the remains of human settlement in the area back to the 9th century, revealing evidence of the Chernyakhov culture and ancient Kievan Rus' civilizations, as well as the Roman Empire. Historic documents first mentioned the settlement in 1414 as the village of Tolste (Ukrainian: Толсте).

In the 15th century, the settlement came under control of the Polish–Lithuanian Commonwealth and was renamed to the Polish variant Tłuste (Ukrainian: Тлусте). In 1548, Tłuste was granted Magdeburg rights, which it kept until 1944 when its status was downgraded to that of an urban-type settlement. The settlement was renamed two years later from its Polish name to its current Ukrainian equivalent Tovste. On December 4, 1996, Tovste was admitted into the League of Historic Cities of Ukraine.

Until 18 July 2020, Tovste belonged to Zalishchyky Raion. The raion was abolished in July 2020 as part of the administrative reform of Ukraine, which reduced the number of raions of Ternopil Oblast to three. The area of Zalishchyky Raion was merged into Chortkiv Raion. On 26 January 2024, a new law entered into force which abolished the urban-type settlement status, and Tovste became a rural settlement.

In the town there are numerous architectural monuments: the Roman Catholic Cathedral of Saint Anne, built in late 19th-early 20th century, whose reconstruction is being funded by former Polish residents of Tovste; the Greek Catholic Church of Saint Michael the Archangel, built from 1913-1939; as well as a modern Ukrainian Orthodox Church, built from 1991-1995. The town also housed a Jewish synagogue, which was destroyed during World War II, the remains of which are no longer to be found.

== People from Tovste ==
- Morris Spitzer, father of Bernard Spitzer, grandfather of former New York Governor Eliot Spitzer.
- Dr. Bernhard Wachstein, Director of the once famous Library of the Israelitische Kultusgemeinde Wien/Vienna (1868-1935)
- Dr. Abraham Stupp, early Zionist, member of the Israeli Knesset, and an editor of a Yiddish newspaper.
