= Stavky, Zalishchyky urban hromada, Chortkiv Raion, Ternopil Oblast =

Village in Ternopil Oblast, Ukraine

Stavky Ставки
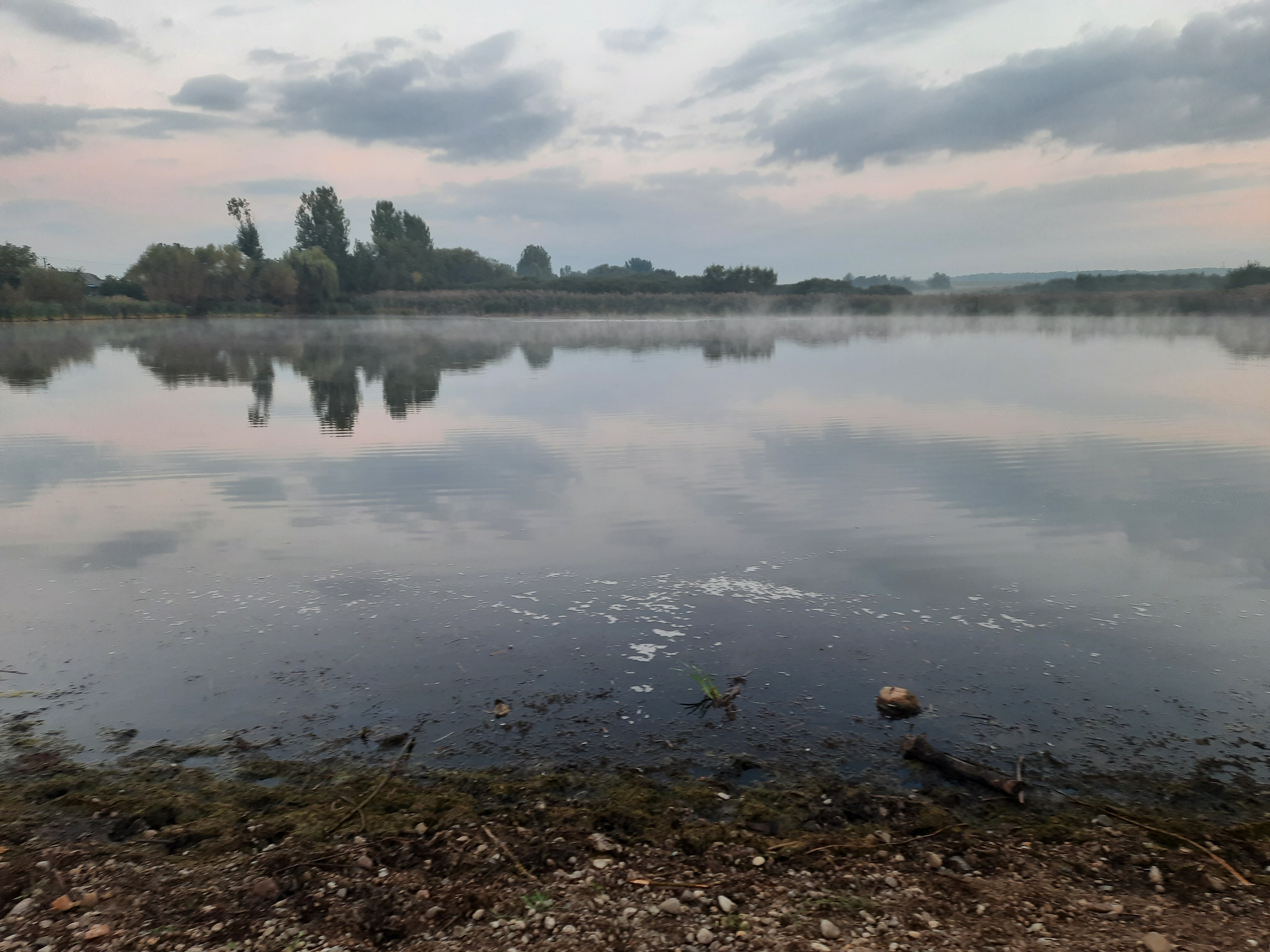

- Location in Ternopil Oblast
- Coordinates: 48°45′00″N 25°47′21″E
- Country: Ukraine
- Oblast: Ternopil Oblast
- Raion: Chortkiv Raion
- Hromada: Zalishchyky Hromada
- Postal code: 48644

Stavky (Ukrainian: Ставки) is a village in Zalishchyky urban hromada, Chortkiv Raion, Ternopil Oblast, Ukraine.

== History ==
The first written mention is from 1900.

== Religion ==
- Saints Peter and Paul Church (1991)

== Sources ==
- "Stawki (8), cz. w. Uhryńkowce, pow. zaleszczycki". Geographical Dictionary of the Kingdom of Poland (in Polish). 11. Warszawa: Kasa im. Józefa Mianowskiego. 1890. p. 303.
