= Dobrivliany, Ternopil Oblast =

Rural locality in Ternopil Oblast, Ukraine

Dobrivliany
- Village
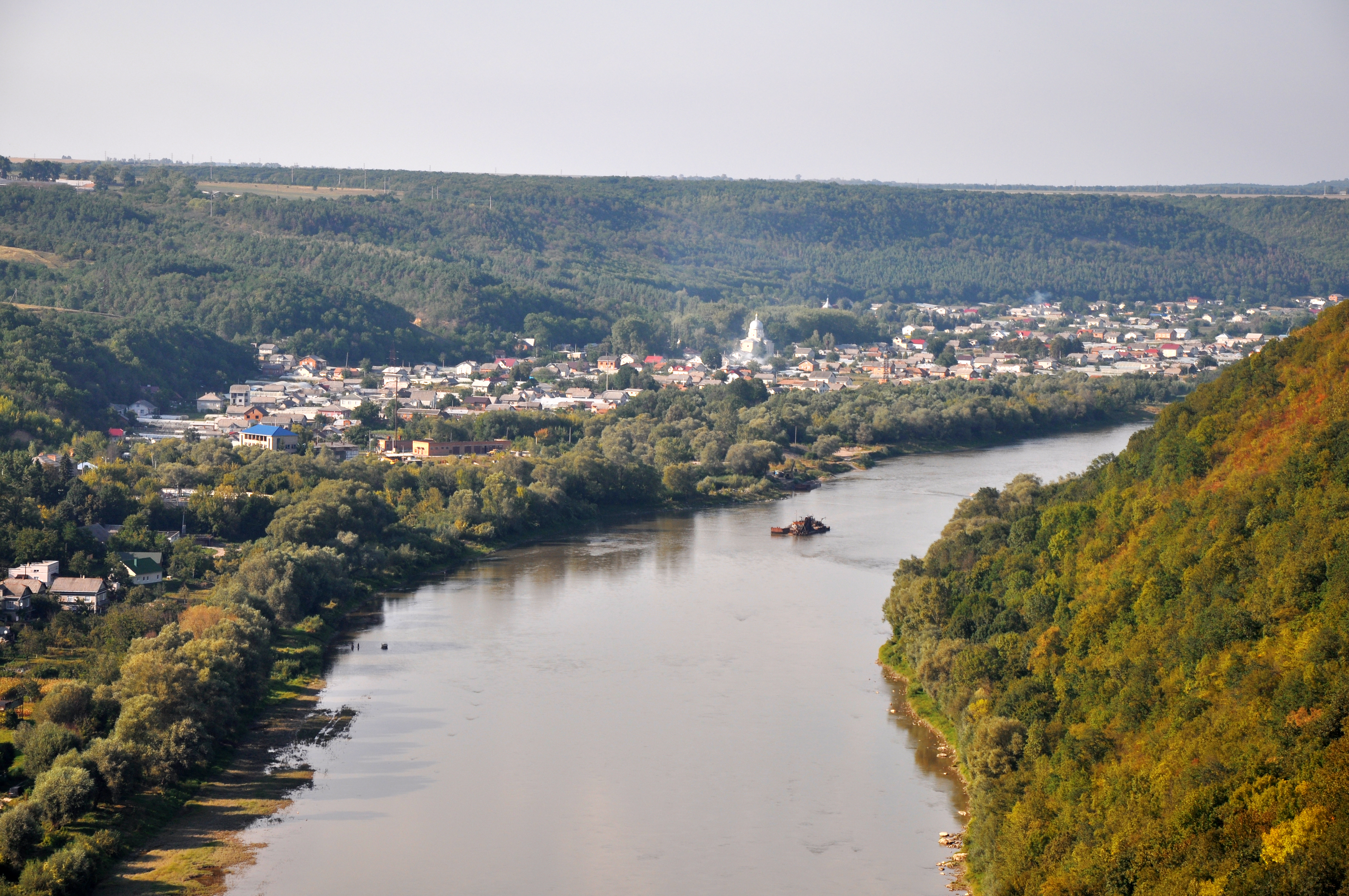
- The village as seen from the Dniester (the outskirts of Zalishchyky are visible in the lower-left corner)

- Location in Ukraine
- Coordinates: 48°40′13″N 25°45′13″E
- Country: Ukraine
- Oblast: Ternopil
- Raion: Chortkiv Raion
- Established: 1440
- Town Status: 1440 – 1981; 1986 –

Area
  - Total: 2.44 km^{2} (0.94 sq mi)

Population (2001)
  - Total: 1,980
- Time zone: UTC+2 (EET)
  - Summer (DST): UTC+3 (EEST)

Dobrivliany (Ukrainian: Добрівля́ни; Polish: Dobrowlany; Romanian: Dobrivleanî) is a village (or selo) in Chortkiv Raion of Ternopil Oblast in Ukraine. It belongs to Zalishchyky urban hromada, one of the hromadas of Ukraine.

== Etymology ==
Several theories exist as to the origins of Dobrivliany's name. Ukrainian scholars often consider two theories: that it derived from the Ukrainian word for the oak tree (Ukrainian: дібров, romanized: dibrov), which was a common plant in the area, or that it derived from the name of a legendary figure who tended to the refugees of Dobrivliany after the town was sacked and burned by Mongol invaders in the 14th century. The gender of this legendary hero varies, when it is a woman, the legend names her "Juliana the Good" (Ukrainian: Добру Уляну, romanized: Dobru Ulyanu), however when the retelling claims it was a man, he is named "Lan' the Good" (Ukrainian: Добрі Лани, romanized: Dobri Lany) – either of which, the legend explains, was assimilated into Polish as Dobrowlany.

Polish scholars, on the other hand, tend to argue the name comes from a Polish lord who once held power in the region, Stefan Dobrilyansky (Ukrainian: Степан Добрівлянський, romanized: Stepan Dobrivlyansʹkyy). Antoni Prochaska cited a 1675 court document from Stryi which showed a didych (Ukrainian: дідич, lit. 'landowner') named “Stefan Dobrilyansky” sued the town's residents for starting a forest fire which damaged his lands in the "oak forest".

A third possibility is that the name ultimately comes from the Pannonian Avars. Oftentimes, towns established by these Turkic peoples were simple derivations of their founder's surnames. For instance, it is hypothesized that a number of towns, such as Obroshyne and Dobryanka, derived their names from a surname or nickname that has its origins in the root of obor- (Russian: обор) or just simply ob- (Russian: об), such as the modern surname of Obrotza (Ukrainian: Оброца) — Dobrivliany could very well be one of them.

== History ==
The area now occupied by Dobrivliany was originally an unincorporated community of people, one of three settlements that would eventually be built here, that later became the original foundation of Zalishchyky sometime before 1340. In 1440, parts of this community broke away and established Dobrivliany as a separate community. The first recorded name of this separate settlement was "Chrona Debra" (Ukrainian: Чорна Дебра, lit. 'Black Debra'), and the first written mention of the town dates to 1580. During eras of invasions from numerous parties (such as the Tatars), Dobrivliany was razed by the Mongols and rebuilt. In 1672, Dobrivliany was destroyed for the second time during the Second Polish–Ottoman War (a fate also shared by Zalishchyky), and since Zalishchyky was re-established around a mile south in 1792, Dobrivliany was assumedly re-established around the same time as well.

Dobrivliany saw large growth in the 18th century. Several floods from the Dniester (what was not an uncommon occurrence) brought numerous populations from surrounding regions to permanently settle in Dobrivliany, thanks in-part to Dobrivliany's main church miraculously surviving each catastrophic flood with often little to no damage. Between 1894 and 1896, Dobrivliany was the site of a brief epidemic of the Black Death.

Thanks to neighboring Zalishchyky's prolific reputation in the world of tourism, Dobrivliany thrived off the area's booming economy before and after World War I, and became a center of winemaking along with the rest of the region. The onset of the Second World War marked the end of this economic prosperity, and Dobrivliany had its share of hard times just like the rest of the area. In 1941, the Dniester again flooded, causing the Germans (who occupied the area for little over a month) to abolish taxes in the area.

Under Soviet control after the end of the Second World War, Dobrivliany was annexed by Zalishchyky in 1981, only to have its independent status restored five years later in 1986.

Until 18 July 2020, Dobrivliany belonged to Zalishchyky Raion. The raion was abolished in July 2020 as part of the administrative reform of Ukraine, which reduced the number of raions of Ternopil Oblast to three. The area of Zalishchyky Raion was merged into Chortkiv Raion.
