= Shchytivtsi =

Village in Ternopil Oblast, Ukraine

Shchytivtsi Щитівці
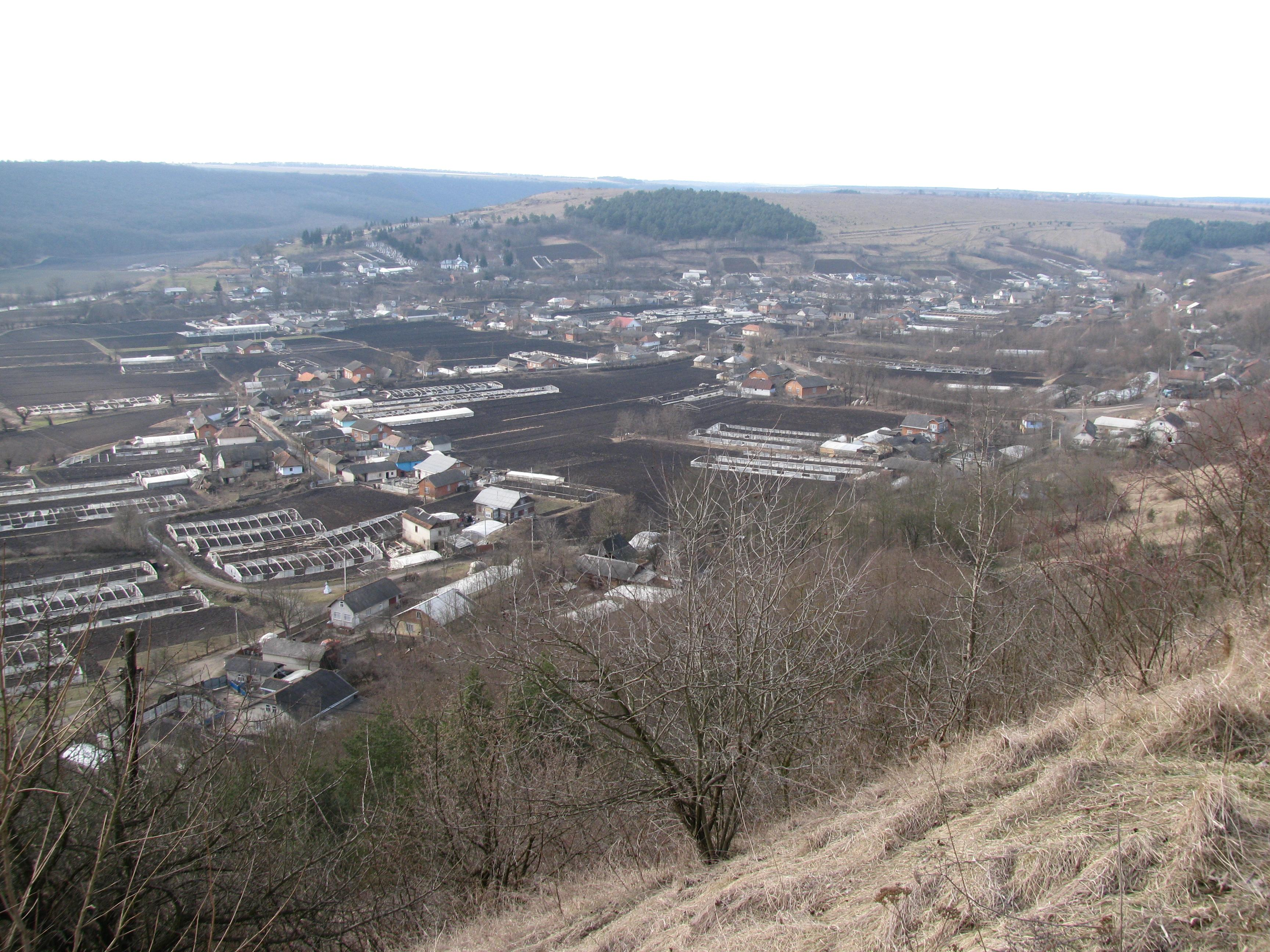

- Location in Ternopil Oblast
- Coordinates: 48°39′31″N 25°52′17″E
- Country: Ukraine
- Oblast: Ternopil Oblast
- Raion: Chortkiv Raion
- Hromada: Zalishchyky Hromada
- Postal code: 48661

Shchytivtsi (Ukrainian: Щитівці; Polish: Szczytowce) is a village in Zalishchyky urban hromada, Chortkiv Raion, Ternopil Oblast, Ukraine.

== History ==
The first written mention is from 1547.

== Religion ==
- Church of the Ascension (1786)

== Notable residents ==
The grave of Mariia Haivoronska, the mother of the composer Michael Hayvoronsky, who died during World War II, is preserved in the local cemetery.
