= Lysychnyky =

Rural locality in Ternopil Oblast, Ukraine

Lysychnyky Лисичники
- Village
- Location within Ternopil Oblast
- Coordinates: 48°41′55″N 25°50′54″E
- Country: Ukraine
- Oblast: Ternopil Oblast
- District: Chortkiv Raion
- Established: 1641

Area
  - Total: 19.790 km^{2} (7.641 sq mi)
- Elevation: 243 m (797 ft)

Population
  - Total: 284.06
  - Density: 2.51/km^{2} (6.5/sq mi)
- Time zone: UTC+2 (EET)
  - Summer (DST): UTC+3 (EEST)
- Postal code: 48653
- Area code: +380 3554
- Website: село Лисичники (in Ukrainian)

Lysychnyky (Ukrainian: Лиси́чники) is a village (selo) in Chortkiv Raion of Ternopil Oblast, of Western Ukraine. The population of the village is just about 647 people. Local government is administered by the Kasperivska (Kasperivtsi) village council. Lysychnyky belongs to Zalishchyky urban hromada, one of the hromadas of Ukraine.

== Geography ==
The village is situated along of the Seret River Area of the village totals is 2.510 km^{2} and is located at an altitude of 243 meters above sea level.
Village Lysychnyky is a distant 132 kilometres (82 mi) from the administrative center of Ternopil, 18 kilometres (11 mi) from the district center Zalischyky and 32 kilometres (20 mi) from the urban-type settlement Tovste.

== History and Attractions ==
The first written record dates from 1641, although on the outskirts of the village archaeological sights of Upper Paleolithic and ancient culture were discovered.

Until 18 July 2020, Lysychnyky belonged to Zalishchyky Raion. The raion was abolished in July 2020 as part of the administrative reform of Ukraine, which reduced the number of raions of Ternopil Oblast to three. The area of Zalishchyky Raion was merged into Chortkiv Raion.

== Religion ==
In 1898, the Church of the Protection of the Blessed Virgin Mary was consecrated.
