= Zalishchyky urban hromada =

Hromada in Ternopil Oblast, Ukraine

Zalishchyky urban hromada Заліщицька міська громада
- hromada
- Seal

- Location within Ternopil Oblast Location within Ukraine
- Coordinates: 48°39′0″N 25°44′6″E
- Country: Ukraine
- Oblast (province): Ternopil Oblast
- Raion (district): Chortkiv Raion
- Administrative centre: Zalishchyky

Government
  - Hromada head: Ivan Drozd

Population (2022)
  - Total: 26,607
- Cities: 1
- Villages: 29

Zalishchyky urban hromada (Ukrainian: Заліщицька міська громада, romanized: Zalishchytska miska hromada) is a hromada of Ukraine, in Chortkiv Raion of Ternopil Oblast. Its administrative centre is Zalishchyky. The hromada has a population of 26,607 (2022 estimate)

== Settlements ==
The hromada consists of 1 city (Zalishchyky) and 29 villages:

- Bedrykivtsi
- Berestok
- Blyshchanka
- Vyhoda
- Vynohradne
- Vyniatyntsi
- Hlushka
- Holihrady
- Horodok
- Dzvyniach
- Dobrivliany
- Duniv
- Duplyska
- Zelenyi Hai
- Zozulyntsi
- Ivane-Zolote
- Kasperivtsi
- Kolodribka
- Kulakivtsi
- Lysychnyky
- Novosilka
- Pechorna
- Synkiv
- Stavky
- Torske
- Uhrynkivtsi
- Khartonivtsi
- Shchytivtsi
- Yakubivka
