= Zalishchyky Raion =

Former subdivision of Ternopil Oblast, Ukraine

Zalishchyky Raion Заліщицький район
- Raion
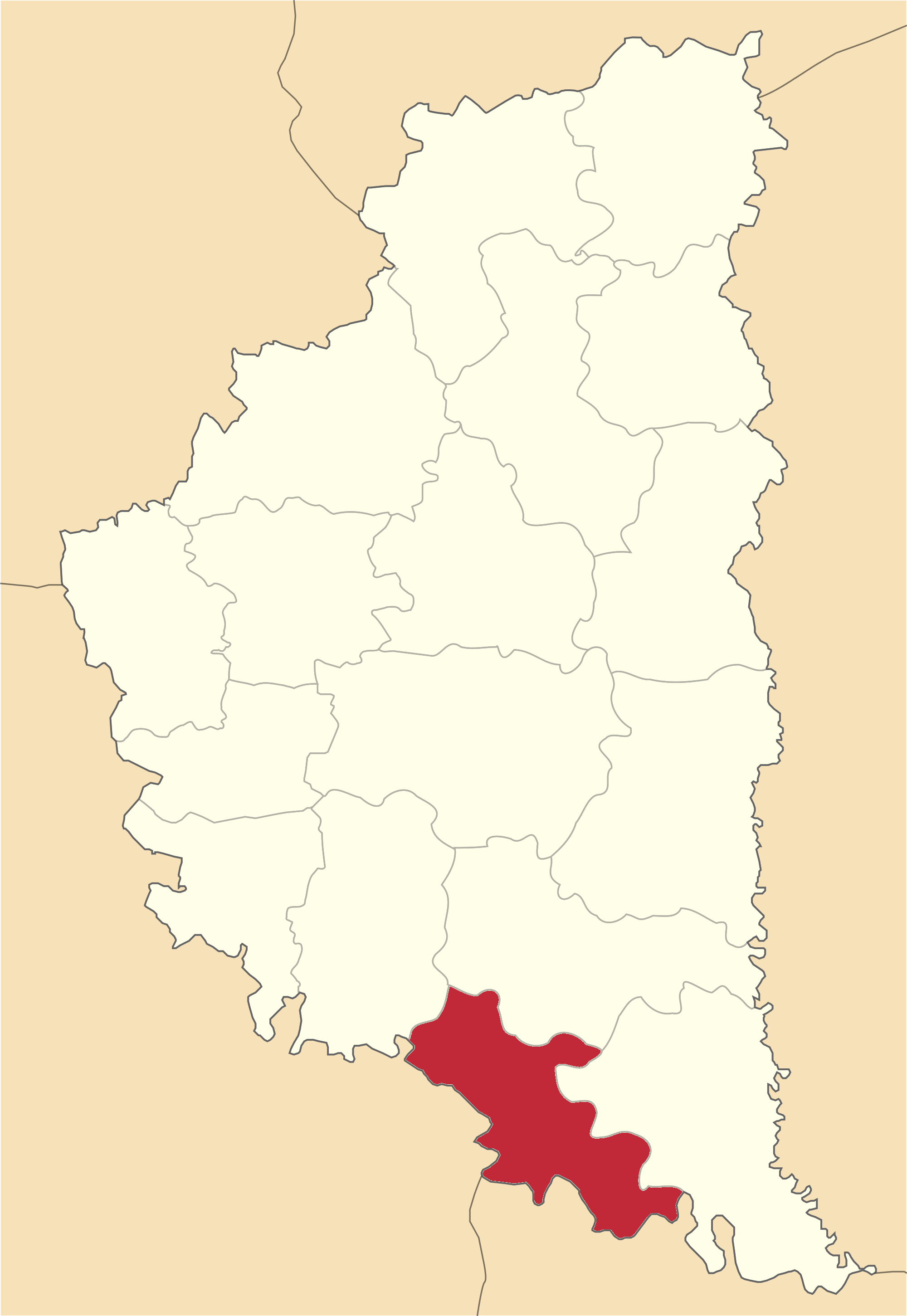
- Coordinates: 48°45′N 25°47′E
- Country: Ukraine
- Oblast: Ternopil Oblast
- Established: 1940
- Disestablished: 18 July 2020
- Admin. center: Zalishchyky
- Subdivisions: List: 1 — city councils; 1 — settlement councils; 35 — rural councils; Number of localities: 1 — cities; 1 — urban-type settlements; 53 — villages; 0 — rural settlements

Area
  - Total: 684 km^{2} (264 sq mi)

Population (2020)
  - Total: 44,955
  - Density: 65.7/km^{2} (170/sq mi)
- Time zone: UTC+02:00 (EET)
  - Summer (DST): UTC+03:00 (EEST)
- Area code: 380-3554

Zalishchyky Raion (Ukrainian: Заліщицький район) was a raion (district) of Ternopil Oblast. The administrative centre and largest town was Zalishchyky. The rest of the district's population lived in one of 35 village councils or 53 rural settlements. The raion was abolished on 18 July 2020 as part of the administrative reform of Ukraine, which reduced the number of raions of Ternopil Oblast to three. The area of Zalishchyky Raion was merged into Chortkiv Raion. The last estimate of the raion population was 44,966 (2020 est.).

== Subdivisions ==
The raion (district) was subdivided into 37 administrative formations known as "rada" (councils). In parentheses are included populated places belonging to the rada (council).

- Bedrykivtsi rural council (Bedrykivtsi)
- Blyshchanka rural council (Blyshchanka and Stavky)
- Buriakivka rural council (Buriakivka)
- Dobrivliany rural council (Dobrivliany)
- Dorohychivka rural council (Dorohychivka)
- Duniv rural council (Duniv, Vyhoda, and Shchytivtsi)
- Duplyska rural council (Duplyska)
- Dzvyniach rural council (Dzvyniach)
- Holovchyntsi rural council (Holovchyntsi and Korolivka)
- Horodok rural council (Horodok)
- Ivane-Zolote rural council (Ivane-Zolote)
- Kasperivtsi rural council (Kasperivtsi and Lysychnyky)
- Khmeleva rural council (Khmeleva and Svershkivtsi)
- Kolodribka rural council (Kolodribka)
- Koshylivtsi rural council (Koshylivtsi and Popivtsi)
- Kulakivtsi rural council (Kulakivtsi)
- Lysivtsi rural council (Lysivtsi)
- Lytiachi rural council (Lytiachi)
- Myshkiv rural council (Myshkiv)
- Novosilka rural council (Novosilka)
- Nyrkiv rural council (Nyrkiv and Nahoriany)
- Podillia rural council (Podillia and Anhelivka)
- Sadky rural council (Sadky)
- Shypivtsi rural council (Shypivtsi)
- Shytromyntsi rural council (Shytromyntsi)
- Slobidka rural council (Slobidka)
- Solone rural council (Solone and Rozhanivka)
- Synkiv rural council (Synkiv)
- Torske rural council (Torske, Hlushka, and Iakubivka)
- Tovste settlement council (Tovste)
- Uhrynkivtsi rural council (Uhrynkivtsi, Berestok, and Khartonivtsi)
- Ustechko rural council (Ustechko)
- Vorvulyntsi rural council (Vorvulyntsi and Hynkivtsi)
- Vyniatyntsi rural council (Vyniatyntsi and Holihrady)
- Zalishchyky urban council (Zalishchyky city)
- Zelenyi Hai rural council (Zelenyi Hai and Pechorna)
- Zozulyntsi rural council (Zozulyntsi and Vynohradne)

Before the raion was abolished, as part of the 2020 administrative reform there were created two hromadas (communities):

- Tovste settlement hromada with the administration in the urban-type settlement of Tovste;
- Zalishchyky urban hromada with the administration in Zalishchyky.

== Demographics ==
- Population: 53,400 (2001)
  - (In 1989 the population was 56,300 – a decline of 5%)
- Density: 85
- Life expectancy: 71
- % Urban population: 25%

== Geography ==
- Area: 684 km^{2}

== Populated places ==
Towns

- Zalishchyky

Urban type settlements

- Tovste

Villages

- Anhelivka
- Bedrykivtsi
- Berestok
- Blyshchanka
- Buriakivka
- Dobrivliany
- Dorohychivka
- Duniv
- Duplyska
- Dzvyniach
- Hlushka
- Holihrady
- Holovchyntsi
- Horodok
- Hynkivtsi
- Ivane-Zolote
- Kasperivtsi
- Khartonivtsi
- Khmeleva
- Kolodribka
- Korolivka
- Koshylivtsi
- Kulakivtsi
- Lysivtsi
- Lysychnyky
- Lytiachi
- Myshkiv
- Nahoriany
- Novosilka
- Nyrkiv
- Pechorna
- Podillia
- Popivtsi
- Rozhanivka
- Sadky
- Shchytivtsi
- Shutromyntsi
- Shypivtsi
- Slobidka
- Solone
- Stavky
- Svershkivtsi
- Synkiv
- Torske
- Uhrynkivtsi
- Ustechko
- Vorvulyntsi
- Vyhoda
- Vyniatyntsi
- Vynohradne
- Yakubivka
- Zelenyi Hai
- Zozulyntsi
